

Alpine skiing

2018 Winter Olympics and Paralympics (Alpine skiing)
 February 11 – 24: Alpine skiing at the 2018 Winter Olympics
 Men's Downhill winners:   Aksel Lund Svindal;   Kjetil Jansrud;   Beat Feuz
 Women's Downhill winners:   Sofia Goggia;   Ragnhild Mowinckel;   Lindsey Vonn
 Men's Super G winners:   Matthias Mayer;   Beat Feuz;   Kjetil Jansrud
 Women's Super G winners:   Ester Ledecká;   Anna Veith;   Tina Weirather
 Men's Giant Slalom winners:   Marcel Hirscher;   Henrik Kristoffersen;   Alexis Pinturault
 Women's Giant Slalom winners:   Mikaela Shiffrin;   Ragnhild Mowinckel;   Federica Brignone
 Men's Slalom winners:   André Myhrer;   Ramon Zenhäusern;   Michael Matt
 Women's Slalom winners:   Frida Hansdotter;   Wendy Holdener;   Katharina Gallhuber
 Men's Combined winners:   Marcel Hirscher;   Alexis Pinturault;   Victor Muffat-Jeandet
 Women's Combined winners:   Michelle Gisin;   Mikaela Shiffrin;   Wendy Holdener
 Mixed Team winners:  ;  ;  
 March 10 – 18: Alpine skiing at the 2018 Winter Paralympics
 Men's Visually Impaired Winners:
 Downhill:   Mac Marcoux;   Jakub Krako;   Giacomo Bertagnolli
 Super G:   Jakub Krako;   Giacomo Bertagnolli;   Miroslav Haraus
 Giant Slalom:   Giacomo Bertagnolli;   Jakub Krako;   Mac Marcoux
 Slalom:   Giacomo Bertagnolli;   Jakub Krako;   Valery Redkozubov
 Super Combined:   Miroslav Haraus;   Jon Santacana Maiztegui;   Valery Redkozubov
 Men's Sitting Winners:
 Downhill:   Andrew Kurka;   Taiki Morii;   Corey Peters
 Super G:   Kurt Oatway;   Andrew Kurka;   Frédéric François
 Giant Slalom:   Jesper Pedersen;   Tyler Walker;   Igor Sikorski
 Slalom:   Dino Sokolović;   Tyler Walker;   Frédéric François
 Super Combined:   Jeroen Kampschreur;   Frédéric François;   Jesper Pedersen
 Men's Standing Winners:
 Downhill:   Théo Gmür;   Arthur Bauchet;   Markus Salcher
 Super G:   Théo Gmür;   Arthur Bauchet;   Markus Salcher
 Giant Slalom:   Théo Gmür;   Alexey Bugaev;   Alexis Guimond
 Slalom:   Adam Hall;   Arthur Bauchet;   Jamie Stanton
 Super Combined:   Alexey Bugaev;   Arthur Bauchet;   Adam Hall
 Women's Visually Impaired Winners:
 Downhill:   Henrieta Farkašová;   Millie Knight;   Eléonor Sana
 Super G:   Henrieta Farkašová;   Millie Knight;   Menna Fitzpatrick
 Giant Slalom:   Henrieta Farkašová;   Menna Fitzpatrick;   Melissa Perrine
 Slalom:   Menna Fitzpatrick;   Henrieta Farkašová;   Millie Knight
 Super Combined:   Henrieta Farkašová;   Menna Fitzpatrick;   Melissa Perrine
 Women's Sitting Winners:
 Downhill:   Anna Schaffelhuber;   Momoka Muraoka;   Laurie Stephens
 Super G:   Anna Schaffelhuber;   Claudia Lösch;   Momoka Muraoka
 Giant Slalom:   Momoka Muraoka;   Linda van Impelen;   Claudia Lösch
 Slalom:   Anna-Lena Forster;   Momoka Muraoka;   Heike Eder
 Super Combined:   Anna-Lena Forster;   Anna Schaffelhuber;   Momoka Muraoka
 Women's Standing Winners:
 Downhill:   Marie Bochet;   Andrea Rothfuss;   Mollie Jepsen
 Super G:   Marie Bochet;   Andrea Rothfuss;   Alana Ramsay
 Giant Slalom:   Marie Bochet;   Andrea Rothfuss;   Mollie Jepsen
 Slalom:   Marie Bochet;   Mollie Jepsen;   Andrea Rothfuss
 Super Combined:   Mollie Jepsen;   Andrea Rothfuss;   Alana Ramsay

FIS World Championships (AS)
 August 27 – September 1, 2017: 2017 FIS Junior Grass Ski World Championships in  Sauris
 Giant Slalom winners:  Martin Bartak (m) /  Chisaki Maeda (f)
 Slalom winners:  Martin Bartak (m) /  Chisaki Maeda (f)
 Super Combined winners:  Martin Bartak (m) /  Adela Kettnerova (f)
 Super G winners:  Martin Bartak (m) /  Chisaki Maeda (f)
 September 5 – 10, 2017: 2017 FIS Grass Ski World Championships in  Kaprun
 Super G winners:  Jan Gardavský (m) /  Adela Kettnerova (f)
 Super Combined winners:  Lorenzo Gritti (m) /  Chisaki Maeda (f)
 Slalom winners:  Michael Stocker (m) /  Jacqueline Gerlach (f)
 Giant Slalom winners:  Jan Gardavský (m) /  Jacqueline Gerlach (f)
 January 29 – February 8: World Junior Alpine Skiing Championships 2018 in  Davos
 Downhill winners:  Marco Odermatt (m) /  Kajsa Vickhoff Lie (f)
 Super G winners:  Marco Odermatt (m) /  Kajsa Vickhoff Lie (f)
 Giant Slalom winners:  Marco Odermatt (m) /  Julia Scheib (f)
 Slalom winners:  Clement Noel (m) /  Meta Hrovat (f)
 Combined winners:  Marco Odermatt (m) /  Aline Danioth (f)
 Team event winners:  (Camille Rast, Marco Odermatt, Aline Danioth, Semyel Bissig)

2017–18 Alpine Skiing World Cup
 October 2017
 October 28 & 29: ASWC #1 in  Sölden
 Note: The Men's Giant Slalom event was cancelled due to a wind storm.
 Women's Giant Slalom winner:  Viktoria Rebensburg 
 November 2017
 November 11 & 12: ASWC #2 in  Levi
 Slalom winners:  Felix Neureuther (m) /  Petra Vlhová (f)
 November 22 – 26: ASWC #3 in  Lake Louise Ski Resort #1
 Men's Downhill winner:  Beat Feuz
 Men's Super G winner:  Kjetil Jansrud
 November 25 & 26: ASWC #4 in  Killington Ski Resort
 Women's Giant Slalom winner:  Viktoria Rebensburg
 Women's Slalom winner:  Mikaela Shiffrin
 November 28 – December 3: ASWC #5 in  Lake Louise Ski Resort #2
 Women's Downhill winners:  Cornelia Hütter (#1) /  Mikaela Shiffrin (#2)
 Women's Super G winner:  Tina Weirather
 November 29 – December 3: ASWC #6 in  Beaver Creek Resort
 Men's Super G winner:  Vincent Kriechmayr
 Men's Downhill winner:  Aksel Lund Svindal
 Men's Giant Slalom winner:  Marcel Hirscher
 December 2017
 December 8 – 10: ASWC #7 in  St. Moritz
 Note: Two, of three, Super G and the Alpine Combined events was cancelled.
 Women's Super G winner:  Jasmine Flury 
 December 9 & 10: ASWC #8 in  Val-d'Isère #1
 Men's Giant Slalom winner:  Alexis Pinturault
 Men's Slalom winner:  Marcel Hirscher
 December 13 – 16: ASWC #9 in  Val Gardena
 Men's Super G winner:  Josef Ferstl
 Men's Downhill winner:  Aksel Lund Svindal
 December 14 – 17: ASWC #10 in  Val-d'Isère #2
 Note: The women's downhill event here was cancelled.
 Women's Super G winners:  Lindsey Vonn (#1) /  Anna Veith (#2)
 December 17 & 18: ASWC #11 in  Alta Badia
 Men's Giant Slalom winner:  Marcel Hirscher
 Men's Parallel Giant Slalom winner:  Matts Olsson
 December 19 & 20: ASWC #12 in  Courchevel
 Women's Giant Slalom & Parallel Slalom winner:  Mikaela Shiffrin
 December 22: ASWC #13 in  Madonna di Campiglio
 Men's Slalom winner:  Marcel Hirscher
 December 26 – 29: ASWC #14 in  Bormio
 Men's Downhill winners:  Dominik Paris (#1) /  Matthias Mayer (#2)
 Men's Alpine Combined winner:  Alexis Pinturault
 December 28 & 29: ASWC #15 in  Lienz
 Women's Giant Slalom winner:  Federica Brignone
 Women's Slalom winner:  Mikaela Shiffrin
 January 2018
 January 1: ASWC #16 in  Oslo
 City Event winners:  André Myhrer (m) /  Mikaela Shiffrin (f)
 January 3 & 4: ASWC #17 in  Zagreb
 Slalom winners: (m) /  Mikaela Shiffrin (f)
 January 6 & 7: ASWC #18 in  Kranjska Gora
 Women's Giant Slalom & Slalom winner:  Mikaela Shiffrin
 January 6 & 7: ASWC #19 in  Adelboden
 Men's Giant Slalom & Slalom winner:  Marcel Hirscher
 January 9: ASWC #20 in  Flachau
 Women's Slalom winner:  Mikaela Shiffrin
 January 9 – 14: ASWC #21 in  Wengen
 Men's Alpine Combined winner:  Victor Muffat-Jeandet
 Men's Downhill winners:  Dominik Paris (#1) /  Beat Feuz (#2)
 Men's Slalom winner:  Marcel Hirscher
 January 11 – 14: ASWC #22 in  Bad Kleinkirchheim
 Women's Downhill winner:  Sofia Goggia
 Women's Super G winner:  Federica Brignone
 January 16 – 21: ASWC #23 in  Kitzbühel
 Men's Super G winner:  Aksel Lund Svindal
 Men's Downhill winner:  Thomas Dreßen
 Men's Slalom winner:  Henrik Kristoffersen
 January 17 – 21: ASWC #24 in  Cortina d'Ampezzo
 Women's Downhill winners:  Sofia Goggia (#1) /  Lindsey Vonn (#2)
 Women's Super G winner:  Lara Gut
 January 23: ASWC #25 in  Schladming
 Men's Slalom winner:  Marcel Hirscher
 January 23: ASWC #26 in  Kronplatz
 Women's Giant Slalom winner:  Viktoria Rebensburg
 January 25 – 28: ASWC #27 in  Garmisch-Partenkirchen #1
 Men's Downhill winner:  Beat Feuz
 Men's Giant Slalom winner:  Marcel Hirscher
 January 26 – 28: ASWC #28 in  Lenzerheide
 Women's Alpine Combined winner:  Wendy Holdener
 Women's Super G winner:  Lindsey Vonn
 Women's Giant Slalom winner:  Tessa Worley
 Women's Slalom winner:  Petra Vlhová
 January 30: ASWC #29 in  Stockholm
 City Event winners:  Ramon Zenhäusern (m) /  Nina Haver-Løseth (f)
 February 2018
 February 1 – 4: ASWC #30 in  Garmisch-Partenkirchen #2
 Women's Downhill winner:  Lindsey Vonn (2 times)
 March 2018
 March 3 & 4: ASWC #31 in  Crans-Montana
 Women's Super G winners:  Tina Weirather (#1) /  Sofia Goggia (#2)
 Women's Alpine Combined winner:  Federica Brignone
 March 3 & 4: ASWC #32 in  Kranjska Gora Ski Resort
 Men's Giant Slalom & Slalom winner:  Marcel Hirscher
 March 8 – 11: ASWC #33 in  Kvitfjell
 Men's Downhill winner:  Thomas Dreßen
 Men's Super G winner:  Kjetil Jansrud
 March 9 & 10: ASWC #34 in  Ofterschwang
 Women's Giant Slalom winner:  Ragnhild Mowinckel
 Women's Slalom winner:  Mikaela Shiffrin
 March 12 – 18: ASWC #35 (final) in  Åre ski resort
 Note: Both the men's Slalom and women's Giant Slalom events were cancelled.
 Men's Downhill winners:  Vincent Kriechmayr and  Matthias Mayer (tie)
 Women's Downhill winner:  Lindsey Vonn
 Super G winners:  Vincent Kriechmayr (m) /  Sofia Goggia (f)
 Men's Giant Slalom winner:  Marcel Hirscher
 Women's Slalom winner:  Mikaela Shiffrin 
 Women's Alpine Team Event winners:

2017 FIS Grass Skiing World Cup
 June 10 & 11: GSWC #1 in  Rettenbach
 Giant Slalom winners:  Edoardo Frau (m) /  Jacqueline Gerlach (f)
 Super Combined winners:  Marc Zickbauer (m) /  Jacqueline Gerlach (f)
 July 29 & 30: GSWC #2 in  Montecampione
 Slalom winners:  Lorenzo Gritti (m) /  Adela Kettnerova (f)
 Giant Slalom winners:  Michael Stocker (m) /  Kristin Hetfleisch (f)
 August 12 & 13: GSWC #3 in  Marbach
 Giant Slalom winners:  Stefan Portmann (m) /  Barbara Míková (f)
 Super G winners:  Stefan Portmann (m) /  Barbara Míková (f)
 August 19 & 20: GSWC #4 in  Předklášteří
 Giant Slalom winners:  Martin Bartak (m) /  Barbara Míková (f)
 Slalom winners:  Lorenzo Gritti (m) /  Barbara Míková (f)
 August 24 & 25: GSWC #5 in  Santa Caterina Valfurva
 Slalom #1 winners:  Lorenzo Gritti (m) /  Jacqueline Gerlach (f)
 Slalom #2 winners:  Lorenzo Gritti (m) /  Jacqueline Gerlach (f)

2017 FIS Australia & New Zealand Cup (AS)
 August 21 – 25: A&NZ #1 in  Thredbo
 Giant Slalom #1 winners:  Adam Barwood (m) /  Sara Hector (f)
 Giant Slalom #2 winners:  Daniel Meier (m) /  Sara Hector (f)
 Slalom #1 winners:  Linus Straßer (m) /  Estelle Alphand (f)
 Slalom #2 winners:  Linus Straßer (m) /  Sara Hector (f)
 August 28 – 31: A&NZ #2 in  Coronet Peak
 Giant Slalom #1 winners:  Erik Read (m) /  Mina Fürst Holtmann (f)
 Giant Slalom #2 winners:  Erik Read (m) /  Sara Hector (f)
 Slalom #1 winners:  Manuel Feller (m) /  Estelle Alphand (f)
 Slalom #2 winners:  Marc Rochat (m) /  Chiara Mair (f)
 September 5 & 6: A&NZ #3 (final) in  Mount Hutt
 Event cancelled.

2017–18 FIS European Cup (AS)
 November 29 & 30, 2017: ECAS #1 in  Funäsdalen
 Women's Slalom winners:  Katharina Liensberger (#1) /  Marina Wallner (#2)
 December 3 & 4, 2017: ECAS #2 in  Hafjell
 Women's Giant Slalom winners:  Estelle Alphand (#1) /  Meta Hrovat (#2)
 December 5 & 6, 2017: ECAS #3 in  Fjätervålen
 Men's Slalom winners:  Ramon Zenhäusern (#1) /  Marc Rochat (#2)
 December 7 – 9, 2017: ECAS #3 in  Kvitfjell #1
 Women's Alpine combined winner:  Franziska Gritsch
 Women's Giant Slalom winner:  Vanessa Kasper
 Women's Super G winner:  Kajsa Vickhoff Lie
 December 8 & 9, 2017: ECAS #4 in  Trysil
 Men's Giant Slalom winners:  Johannes Strolz (2 times)
 December 13, 2017: ECAS #5 in  Obereggen
 Men's Slalom winner:  Matej Vidović
 December 14 & 15, 2017: ECAS #6 in  Andalo
 Note: One, of two, Giant Slalom events was cancelled.
 Women's Giant Slalom winner:  Meta Hrovat
 December 16, 2017: ECAS #7 in  Kronplatz
 Parallel Slalom winners:  Dominik Raschner (m) /  Aline Danioth (f)
 Slalom (Qualification Race) winners:  Matej Vidović (m) /  Franziska Gritsch (f)
 December 18, 2017: ECAS #8 in  Fassa Valley
 Men's Slalom winner:  Stefano Gross
 December 20 & 21, 2017: ECAS #9 in  Reiteralm
 Men's Super G winners:  Niklas Köck (#1) /  Christoph Krenn (#2)
 December 19 – 22, 2017: ECAS #10 in  Fassa Valley
 Women's Downhill winner:  Juliana Suter (2 times)
 January 5 & 6: ECAS #10 in  Wengen
 Note: One, of two, Super G events was cancelled.
 Men's Super G winner:  Emanuele Buzzi
 January 8 – 12: ECAS #11 in  Innerkrems
 Women's Alpine combined winner:  Lisa Hörnblad
 Wome's Super G winners:  Nina Ortlieb (#1) /  Franziska Gritsch (#2)
 January 8 – 12: ECAS #12 in  Saalbach-Hinterglemm
 Men's Alpine combined winner:  Marco Pfiffner
 Men's Downhill winners:  Daniel Hemetsberger (#1) /  Henrik Roea (#2)
 January 13 & 14: ECAS #13 in  Zell am See
 Women's Slalom winners:  Magdalena Fjällström (#1) /  Marina Wallner (#2)
 January 14 & 15: ECAS #14 in  Kirchberg
 Men's Giant Slalom winners:  Florian Eisath (#1) /  Alex Hofer (#2)
 January 15 – 19: ECAS #15 in  Zauchensee
 Note: Here, the downhill events competition were cancelled.
 Women's Super G winner:  Lisa Hörnblad
 January 17 – 21: ECAS #16 in  Méribel
 Event cancelled.
 January 22 & 23: ECAS #17 in  Folgaria/Lavarone
 Men's Giant Slalom winners:  Stefan Brennsteiner (#1) /  Marco Odermatt (#2)
 January 23 & 24: ECAS #18 in  Zinal
 Event cancelled.
 January 25 & 26: ECAS #19 in  Melchsee-Frutt
 Women's Slalom winners:  Anna Swenn-Larsson (2 times)
 January 25 & 26: ECAS #20 in  Chamonix
 Men's Slalom winners:  Johannes Strolz (#1) /  Simon Maurberger (#2)
 February 16 & 17: ECAS #21 in  Jaun
 Men's Slalom winners:  Matej Vidović (#1) /  Marc Rochat (#2)
 February 17 & 18: ECAS #22 in  Bad Wiessee
 Women's Slalom winner:  Charlotta Säfvenberg (2 times) 
 February 19 – 23: ECAS #23 in  Sarntal
 Men's Downhill winners:  Stian Saugestad (#1) /  Adrian Smiseth Sejersted (#2)
 Men's Alpine combined winner:  Johannes Strolz
 February 24 – 28: ECAS #24 in  Crans-Montana
 Women's Downhill winners:  Ariane Raedler (#1 & #3) /  Priska Nufer (#2)
 Women's Super G winner:  Jasmine Flury
 February 26 & 27: ECAS #25 in  St. Moritz
 Men's Giant Slalom winners:  Thibaut Favrot (#1) /  Thomas Tumler (#2)
 March 1 & 2: ECAS #26 in  Zinal
 Women's Giant Slalom winners:  Thea Louise Stjernesund (#1) /  Katharina Liensberger (#2)
 March 3 – 6: ECAS #27 in  Kvitfjell #2
 Men's Downhill winners:  Adrian Smiseth Sejersted (#1) /  Christopher Neumayer (#2)
 March 8 & 9: ECAS #28 in  La Molina
 Women's Giant Slalom winners:  Thea Louise Stjernesund (#1) /  Nina Ortlieb (#2)
 March 10 & 11: ECAS #29 in  Berchtesgaden
 Men's Giant Slalom winner:  Timon Haugan
 Men's Slalom winner:  Marc Rochat
 March 12 – 18: ECAS #30 (final) in  Soldeu - El Tarter
 Downhill winners:  Otmar Striedinger (m) /  Ariane Raedler (f)
 Giant Slalom winners:  Dominik Raschner (m) /  Kristine Gjelsten Haugen (f)
 Super G winners:  Stefan Rogentin (m) /  Ariane Raedler (f)
 Slalom winners:  Christian Hirschbuehl /  Josephine Forni (f)

2017–18 Far East Cup (AS)
 December 6 – 9, 2017: FEC #1 in  Wanlong
 Men's Slalom winners:  Ondřej Berndt (2 times)
 Women's Slalom winners:  Asa Ando (2 times)
 Men's Giant Slalom winners:  Vladislav Novikov (2 times)
 Women's Giant Slalom winners:  Sakurako Mukogawa (#1) /  Asa Ando (#2)
 December 13 – 16, 2017: FEC #2 in  Songhua
 Men's Slalom winners:  Hideyuki Narita (2 times)
 Women's Slalom winners:  Neja Dvornik (#1) /  Sakurako Mukogawa (#2)
 Men's Giant Slalom winners:  Cédric Noger (2 times)
 Women's Giant Slalom winners:  Sakurako Mukogawa (2 times)
 January 8 – 12: FEC #3 in  High1 Resort
 Men's Giant Slalom winners:  Charlie Raposo (#1) /  Cédric Noger (#2)
 Women's Giant Slalom winners:  Haruna Ishikawa (#1) /  Mio Arai (#2)
 Men's Slalom winners:  Joaquim Salarich (#1) /  Juan del Campo (#2)
 Women's Slalom winners:  Yukina Tomii (#1) /  Sakurako Mukogawa (#2)
 Alpine Combined winners:  Matej Falat (m) /  Sakurako Mukogawa (f)
 Super G winners:  Hideyuki Narita (m) /  Sakurako Mukogawa (f)
 January 14 & 15: FEC #4 in  High1 Resort
 Men's Slalom winners:  Matej Falat (#1) /  Juan del Campo (#2)
 Women's Slalom winners:  Sakurako Mukogawa (#1) /  Haruna Ishikawa (#2)
 February 5 – 7: FEC #5 in  Engaru
 Giant Slalom winners:  Anthon Cassman (m) /  Haruna Ishikawa (f)
 Men's Slalom winners:  Richard Leitgeb (#1) /  Hideyuki Narita (#2)
 Women's Slalom winners:  Josephine Forni (2 times)
 March 9 – 11: FEC #6 in  Sapporo
Note: Here the Giant Slalom events are cancelled.
 Slalom winners:  Ryunosuke Ohkoshi (m) /  Sakurako Mukogawa (f)

2017–18 North American Cup (AS)
 November 18 & 19, 2017: NAC #1 in  Loveland Ski Area
 Women's Slalom winners:  Erin Mielzynski (#1) /  Laurence St-Germain (#2)
 November 18 – 21, 2017: NAC #2 in  Copper Mountain
 Men's Giant Slalom winners:  Phil Brown (#1) /  Trevor Philp (#2)
 Women's Giant Slalom winners:  Marie-Michèle Gagnon (#1) /  AJ Hurt (#2)
 Men's Slalom winners:  Phil Brown (#1) /  Jeffrey Read (#2)
 December 4 – 8, 2017: NAC #3 in  Lake Louise
 Downhill winners:  Markus Dürager (m) /  Roni Remme (f)
 Super G winners:  Sam Mulligan (m) /  Roni Remme (f)
 December 9 – 16, 2017: NAC #4 in  Panorama
 Alpine combined winners:  River Radamus (m) /  Roni Remme (f)
 Men's Super G winners:  Jeffrey Read (#1) /  River Radamus (#2)
 Women's Super G winners:  Roni Remme (#1) /  AJ Hurt (#2)
 Men's Giant Slalom winners:  Brian McLaughlin (#1) /  River Radamus (#2)
 Women's Giant Slalom winners:  Adriana Jelinkova (#1) /  Alice Robinson (#2)
 Men's Slalom winners:  Tanguy Nef (#1) /  Nolan Kasper (#2)
 Women's Slalom winners:  Roni Remme (2 times)
 February 13 – 16: NAC #5 in  Stowe Mountain Resort
 Men's Giant Slalom winners:  Tanguy Nef (#1) /  Charlie Raposo (#2)
 Men's Slalom winners:  Michael Ankeny (#1) /  Luke Winters (#2)
 February 13 – 16: NAC #6 in  Whiteface Mountain
 Women's Giant Slalom winners:  Mikaela Tommy (2 times)
 Women's Slalom winners:  Nina O'Brien (2 times)
 February 26 – March 4: NAC #7 in  Copper Mountain Resort
 Men's Downhill winners:  James Crawford (#1) /  Jeffrey Read (#2)
 Women's Downhill winners:  Maureen Lebel (#1) /  Roni Remme (#2)
 Alpine combined winners:  Sam Mulligan (m) /  Valérie Grenier (f)
 Super G winners:  Broderick Thompson (m) /  Valérie Grenier (f)

2017 FIS South American Cup (AS)
 August 1 – 5: SAC #1 in  Chapelco
 This event is cancelled.
 August 7 – 11: SAC #2 in  Cerro Catedral
 Giant Slalom winners: Men's here is cancelled /  Nicol Gastaldi (f)
 Slalom winners:  Sebastiano Gastaldi (m) /  Kim Vanreusel (f)
 August 12 – 15: SAC #3 in  Antillanca (part of South American Alpine Skiing Championships)
 This event is cancelled.
 September 2: SAC #4 in  El Colorado #1
 Giant Slalom winners:  Rasmus Windingstad (m) /  Anna Hofer (f)
 September 3–8: SAC #5 in  La Parva
 Slalom winners:  Martin Arene (m) /  Núria Pau (f)
 Downhill #1 winners:  Brice Roger (m) /  Ester Ledecká (f)
 Downhill #2 winners:  Klemen Kosi (m) /  Ester Ledecká (f)
 Super G winners:  Thomas Dreßen (m) /  Ester Ledecká (f)
 September 10 – 12: SAC #6 in  Chapelco
 Giant Slalom #1 winners:  Sebastiano Gastaldi (m) /  Noelle Barahona (f)
 Giant Slalom #2 winner:  Sebastiano Gastaldi (Men's only)
 September 13 & 14: SAC #7 in  Cerro Catedral #2
 Slalom winners:  Tomas Birkner De Miguel (m) /  Núria Pau (f)
 Giant Slalom here is cancelled.
 September 18 – 22: SAC #8 (final) in  El Colorado #2
 Alpine combined #1 winners:  Rasmus Windingstad (m) /  Núria Pau (f)
 Alpine combined #2 winners:  Marko Vukićević (m) /  Aleksandra Prokopyeva (f)
 Super G #1 winners:  Klemen Kosi (m) /  Aleksandra Prokopyeva (f)
 Super G #2 winners:  Jack Gower (m) /  Iulija Pleshkova (f)
 Downhill #1 winners:  Marko Vukićević (m) (2 runs) /  Aleksandra Prokopyeva (f)
 Downhill #2 winners:  Marko Vukićević (m) (2 runs) /  Aleksandra Prokopyeva (f)

Biathlon
2018 Winter Olympics and Paralympics (Biathlon)
 February 10 – 23: Biathlon at the 2018 Winter Olympics
 Men's Individual winners:   Johannes Thingnes Bø;   Jakov Fak;   Dominik Landertinger
 Women's Individual winners:   Hanna Öberg;   Anastasiya Kuzmina;   Laura Dahlmeier
 Men's Sprint winners:   Arnd Peiffer;   Michal Krčmář;   Dominik Windisch
 Women's Sprint winners:   Laura Dahlmeier;   Marte Olsbu;   Veronika Vítková
 Men's Pursuit winners:   Martin Fourcade;   Sebastian Samuelsson;   Benedikt Doll
 Women's Pursuit winners:   Laura Dahlmeier;   Anastasiya Kuzmina;   Anaïs Bescond
 Men's Mass Start winners:   Martin Fourcade;   Simon Schempp;   Emil Hegle Svendsen
 Women's Mass Start winners:   Anastasiya Kuzmina;   Darya Domracheva;   Tiril Eckhoff
 Men's 4 x 7.5 km Relay winners:  ;  ;  
 Women's 4 x 6 km Relay winners:  ;  ;  
 Mixed 2 x 6 km / 2 x 7.5 km Relay winners:  ;  ;  
 March 10, 13, & 16: Biathlon at the 2018 Winter Paralympics
 Men's Visually Impaired Winners: 7.5 km:   Vitaliy Lukyanenko;   Yury Holub;   Anatolii Kovalevskyi
 12.5 km:   Yury Holub;   Oleksandr Kazik;   Iurii Utkin
 15 km:   Vitaliy Lukyanenko;   Oleksandr Kazik;   Anthony Chalencon
 Men's Sitting Winners: 7.5 km:   Daniel Cnossen;   Dzmitry Loban;   Collin Cameron
 12.5 km:   Taras Rad;   Daniel Cnossen;   Andy Soule
 15 km:   Martin Fleig;   Daniel Cnossen;   Collin Cameron
 Men's Standing Winners: 7.5 km:   Benjamin Daviet;   Mark Arendz;   Ihor Reptyukh
 12.5 km:   Benjamin Daviet;   Ihor Reptyukh;   Mark Arendz
 15 km:   Mark Arendz;   Benjamin Daviet;   Nils Erik Ulset
 Women's Visually Impaired Winners: 6 km:   Mikhalina Lysova;   Oksana Shyshkova;   Sviatlana Sakhanenka
 10 km:   Oksana Shyshkova;   Mikhalina Lysova;   Clara Klug
 12.5 km:   Mikhalina Lysova;   Oksana Shyshkova;   Clara Klug
 Women's Sitting Winners: 6 km:   Kendall Gretsch;   Oksana Masters;   Lidziya Hrafeyeva
 10 km:   Andrea Eskau;   Marta Zaynullina;   Irina Gulyayeva
 12.5 km:   Andrea Eskau;   Oksana Masters;   Lidziya Hrafeyeva
 Women's Standing Winners: 6 km:   Ekaterina Rumyantseva;   Anna Burmistrova;   Liudmyla Liashenko
 10 km:   Ekaterina Rumyantseva;   Anna Burmistrova;   Liudmyla Liashenko
 12.5 km:   Anna Burmistrova;   Ekaterina Rumyantseva;   Brittany Hudak

International biathlon championships
 January 23 – 28: 2018 IBU Open European Championships in  Ridnaun-Val Ridanna
 Individual winners:  Felix Leitner (m) /  Chloe Chevalier (f)
 Sprint winners:  Andrejs Rastorgujevs (m) /  Iryna Varvynets (f)
 Pursuit winners:  Alexandr Loginov (m) /  Chloe Chevalier (f)
 Single mixed relay winners:  (Thekla Brun-Lie & Vetle Sjåstad Christiansen)
 2x6+2x7.5 km mixed relay winners:  (Yuliya Zhuravok, Iryna Varvynets, Artem Pryma, & Dmytro Pidruchnyi)
 January 30 – February 4: 2018 IBU Junior Open European Championships in  Pokljuka
 Junior individual winners:  Said Karimulla Khalili (m) /  Tamara Steiner (f)
 Junior sprint winners:  Igor Malinovskii (m) /  Valeriia Vasnetcova (f)
 Junior pursuit winners:  Igor Malinovskii (m) /  Polina Shevnina (f)
 Junior single mixed relay winners:  (Jenni Keranen & Jaakko Ranta)
 Junior 2x6+2x7.5 km mixed relay winners:  (Polina Shevnina, Valeriia Vasnetcova, Vasilii Tomshin, & Igor Malinovskii)
 February 26 – March 4: 2018 IBU Youth/Junior World Championships in  Otepää
 Junior individual winners:  Igor Malinovskii (m) /  Kamila Zuk (f)
 Junior sprint winners:  Vasilii Tomshin (m) /  Kamila Zuk (f)
 Junior pursuit winners:  Sverre Dahlen Aspenes (m) /  Marketa Davidova (f)
 Junior Men's 4x7.5 km relay winners:  (Said Karimulla Khalili, Vasilii Tomshin, Viacheslav Maleev, & Igor Malinovskii)
 Junior Women's 3x6 km relay winners:  (Camille Bened, Myrtille Begue, & Lou Jeanmonnot-Laurent)
 Youth individual winners:  Mikhail Pervushin (m) /  Elvira Oeberg (f)
 Youth sprint winners:  Mikhail Pervushin (m) /  Elvira Oeberg (f)
 Youth pursuit winners:  Andrei Viukhin (m) /  Anastasiia Goreeva (f)
 Youth Men's 3x7.5 km relay winners:  (Denis Tashtimerov, Andrei Viukhin, & Mikhail Pervushin)
 Youth Women's 3x6 km relay winners:  (Amanda Lundstroem, Ella Halvarsson, & Elvira Oeberg)

2017–18 Biathlon World Cup
 November 24, 2017 – December 3, 2017: BWC #1 in  Östersund
 Individual winners:  Johannes Thingnes Bø (m) /  Nadezhda Skardino (f)
 Sprint winners:  Tarjei Bø (m) /  Denise Herrmann (f)
 Pursuit winners:  Martin Fourcade (m) /  Denise Herrmann (f)
 Single mixed relay winners:  (Lisa Hauser & Simon Eder)
 2x6+2x7.5 km Mixed Relay winners:  (Ingrid Landmark Tandrevold, Tiril Eckhoff, Johannes Thingnes Bø, & Emil Hegle Svendsen)
 December 5 – 10, 2017: BWC #2 in  Hochfilzen
 Sprint winners:  Johannes Thingnes Bø (m) /  Darya Domracheva (f)
 Pursuit winners:  Johannes Thingnes Bø (m) /  Anastasiya Kuzmina (f)
 Men's 4x7.5 km relay winners:  (Ole Einar Bjørndalen, Henrik L'Abée-Lund, Erlend Bjøntegaard, & Lars Helge Birkeland)
 Women's 4x6 km relay winners:  (Vanessa Hinz, Franziska Hildebrand, Maren Hammerschmidt, & Laura Dahlmeier)
 December 12 – 17, 2017: BWC #3 in  Annecy-Le Grand-Bornand
 Sprint winners:  Johannes Thingnes Bø (m) /  Anastasiya Kuzmina (f)
 Pursuit winners:  Johannes Thingnes Bø (m) /  Laura Dahlmeier (f)
 Mass Start winners:  Martin Fourcade (m) /  Justine Braisaz (f)
 January 2 – 7: BWC #4 in  Oberhof
 Sprint winners:  Martin Fourcade (m) /  Anastasiya Kuzmina (f)
 Pursuit winners:  Martin Fourcade (m) /  Anastasiya Kuzmina (f)
 Men's 4x7.5 km relay winners:  (Martin Ponsiluoma, Jesper Nelin, Sebastian Samuelsson, & Fredrik Lindström)
 Women's 4x6 km relay winners:  (Anaïs Bescond, Anaïs Chevalier, Célia Aymonier, & Justine Braisaz)
 January 9 – 14: BWC #5 in  Ruhpolding
 Individual winners:  Martin Fourcade (m) /  Dorothea Wierer (f)
 Men's 4x7.5 km relay winners:  (Lars Helge Birkeland, Tarjei Bø, Emil Hegle Svendsen, & Johannes Thingnes Bø)
 Women's 4x6 km relay winners:  (Franziska Preuß, Denise Herrmann, Franziska Hildebrand, & Laura Dahlmeier)
 Mass Start winners:  Johannes Thingnes Bø (m) /  Kaisa Mäkäräinen (f)
 January 16 – 21: BWC #6 in  Antholz-Anterselva
 Sprint winners:  Johannes Thingnes Bø (m) /  Tiril Eckhoff (f)
 Pursuit winners:  Johannes Thingnes Bø (m) /  Laura Dahlmeier (f)
 Mass Start winners:  Martin Fourcade (m) /  Darya Domracheva (f)
 March 6 – 11: BWC #7 in  Kontiolahti
 Sprint winners:  Anton Shipulin (m) /  Darya Domracheva (f)
 Single mixed relay winners:  (Anaïs Chevalier & Antonin Guigonnat)
 2x6+2x7.5 km Mixed Relay winners:  (Dorothea Wierer, Lisa Vittozzi, Dominik Windisch, & Lukas Hofer)
 Mass Start winners:  Julian Eberhard (m) /  Vanessa Hinz (f)
 March 13 – 18: BWC #8 in  Oslo-Holmenkollen
 Sprint winners:  Henrik L'Abée-Lund (m) /  Anastasiya Kuzmina (f)
 Pursuit winners:  Martin Fourcade (m) /  Darya Domracheva (f)
 Men's 4x7.5 km relay winners:  (Lars Helge Birkeland, Henrik L'Abée-Lund, Tarjei Bø, & Johannes Thingnes Bø)
 Women's 4x6 km relay winners:  (Anaïs Chevalier, Célia Aymonier, Marie Dorin Habert, & Anaïs Bescond)
 March 20 – 25: BWC #9 (final) in  Tyumen
 Sprint winners:  Martin Fourcade (m) /  Darya Domracheva (f)
 Pursuit winners:  Martin Fourcade (m) /  Kaisa Mäkäräinen (f)
 Mass Start winners:  Maxim Tsvetkov (m) /  Darya Domracheva (f)

2017–18 IBU Cup
 November 22 – 26, 2017: IBU Cup #1 in  Sjusjøen
 Men's 10 km winners:  Emilien Jacquelin (#1) /  Tarjei Bø (#2)
 Women's 7.5 km winners:  Uliana Kaisheva (#1) /  Denise Herrmann (#2)
 Single mixed relay winners:  (Julia Simon & Antonin Guigonnat)
 2x6+2x7.5 km Mixed Relay winners:  (Uliana Kaisheva, Irina Uslugina, Alexander Povarnitsyn, Alexey Slepov)
 December 7 – 10, 2017: IBU Cup #2 in  Lenzerheide
 Pursuit winners:  Antonin Guigonnat (m) /  Uliana Kaisheva (f)
 Sprint winners:  Antonin Guigonnat (m) /  Uliana Kaisheva (f)
 Single mixed relay winners:  (Thekla Brun-Lie & Vetle Sjåstad Christiansen)
 2x6+2x7.5 km Mixed Relay winners:  (Enora Latuillière, Chloe Chevalier, Clement Dumont, & Fabien Claude)
 December 13 – 17, 2017: IBU Cup #3 in  Obertilliach
 Individual winners:  Vetle Sjåstad Christiansen (m) /  Monika Hojnisz (f)
 Sprint winners:  Dmitry Malyshko (m) /  Karolin Horchler (f)
 Single mixed relay winners:  (Kristina Reztsova & Alexey Volkov)
 2x6+2x7.5 km Mixed Relay winners:  (Emilie Aagheim Kalkenberg, Karoline Offigstad Knotten, Vetle Sjåstad Christiansen, & Vegard Gjermundshaug)
 January 5 – 7: IBU Cup #4 in  Brezno-Osrblie
 Men's 10 km winners:  Simon Fourcade (#1) /  Vegard Gjermundshaug (#2)
 Women's 7.5 km winner:  Uliana Kaisheva (2 times)
 January 10 – 13: IBU Cup #5 in  Großer Arber
 Individual winners:  Jean-Guillaume Béatrix (m) /  Nadine Horchler (f)
 Sprint winners:  Vetle Sjåstad Christiansen (m) /  Hilde Fenne (f)
 February 1 – 3: IBU Cup #6 in  Martell-Val Martello
 Sprint winners:  Alexandr Loginov (m) /  Victoria Slivko (f)
 Pursuit winners:  Alexandr Loginov (m) /  Anastasia Zagoruiko (f)
 March 9 – 11: IBU Cup #7 in  Uvat
 Individual winners:  Fabien Claude (m) /  Irina Uslugina (f)
 Sprint winners:  Alexandr Loginov (m) /  Evgeniya Pavlova (f)
 March 13 – 17: IBU Cup #8 (final) in  Khanty-Mansiysk
 Super Sprint winners:  Vetle Sjåstad Christiansen (m) /  Karolin Horchler (f)
 Sprint winners:  Alexey Slepov (m) /  Julia Schwaiger (f)
 Pursuit winners:  Alexandr Loginov (m) /  Irina Uslugina (f)

2017–18 IBU Junior Cup
 December 8 – 10, 2017: IBUJC #1 in  Obertilliach
 Junior Sprint #1 winners:  Hugo Rivail (m) /  Myrtille Begue (f)
 Junior Sprint #2 winners:  Emilien Claude (m) /  Sophia Schneider (f)
 December 14 – 16, 2017: IBUJC #2 in  Ridnaun-Val Ridanna
 Junior Individual winners:  Vasilii Tomshin (m) /  Irene Lardschneider (f)
 Junior Sprint winners:  Dzmitry Lazouski (m) /  Marina Sauter (f)
 January 25 – 27: IBUJC #3 (final) in  Nové Město na Moravě
 Note: This event was supposed to be held in Duszniki-Zdrój, but it was moved due to unexplained reasons.
 Junior Sprint #1 winners:  Emilien Claude (m) /  Lou Jeanmonnot-Laurent (f)
 Junior Sprint #2 winners:  Martin Perrillat Bottonet (m) /  Sophia Schneider (f)

Cross-country skiing
2018 Winter Olympics and Paralympics (XC)
 February 10 – 25: Cross-country skiing at the 2018 Winter Olympics
 Men's 15 km Freestyle winners:   Dario Cologna;   Simen Hegstad Krüger;   Denis Spitsov
 Women's 10 km Freestyle winners:   Ragnhild Haga;   Charlotte Kalla;   Marit Bjørgen;   Krista Pärmäkoski
 Men's 30 km Skiathlon winners:   Simen Hegstad Krüger;   Martin Johnsrud Sundby;   Hans Christer Holund
 Women's 15 km Skiathlon winners:   Charlotte Kalla;   Marit Bjørgen;   Krista Pärmäkoski
 Men's 50 km Classical winners:   Iivo Niskanen;   Aleksandr Bolshunov;   Andrey Larkov
 Women's 30 km Classical winners:   Marit Bjørgen;   Krista Pärmäkoski;   Stina Nilsson
 Men's 4 x 10 km Relay winners:  ;  ;  
 Women's 4 x 5 km Relay winners:  ;  ;  
 Men's Sprint Classical winners:   Johannes Høsflot Klæbo;   Federico Pellegrino;   Alexander Bolshunov
 Women's Sprint Classical winners:   Stina Nilsson;   Maiken Caspersen Falla;   Yulia Belorukova
 Men's Team Sprint Freestyle winners:   (Martin Johnsrud Sundby & Johannes Høsflot Klæbo);   (Denis Spitsov & Aleksandr Bolshunov);   (Maurice Manificat & Richard Jouve)
 Women's Team Sprint Freestyle winners:   (Kikkan Randall & Jessie Diggins);   (Charlotte Kalla & Stina Nilsson);   (Marit Bjørgen & Maiken Caspersen Falla)
 March 11 – 18: Cross-country skiing at the 2018 Winter Paralympics
 Men's Visually Impaired Winners: Sprint:   Brian McKeever;   Zebastian Modin;   Eirik Bye
 10 km:   Brian McKeever;   Jake Adicoff;   Yury Holub
 20 km Freestyle:   Brian McKeever;   Yury Holub;   Thomas Clarion
 Men's Sitting Winners: Sprint:   Andy Soule;   Dzmitry Loban;   Daniel Cnossen
 7.5 km:   Sin Eui-hyun;   Daniel Cnossen;   Maksym Yarovyi
 15 km:   Maksym Yarovyi;   Daniel Cnossen;   Sin Eui-hyun
 Men's Standing Winners: Sprint:   Alexandr Kolyadin;   Yoshihiro Nitta;   Mark Arendz;   Ilkka Tuomisto
 10 km:   Yoshihiro Nitta;   Grygorii Vovchynskyi;   Mark Arendz
 20 km Freestyle:   Ihor Reptyukh;   Benjamin Daviet;   Håkon Olsrud
 Women's Visually Impaired Winners: Sprint:   Sviatlana Sakhanenka;   Mikhalina Lysova;   Oksana Shyshkova
 7.5 km:   Sviatlana Sakhanenka;   Mikhalina Lysova;   Carina Edlinger
 15 km Freestyle:   Sviatlana Sakhanenka;   Oksana Shyshkova;   Mikhalina Lysova
 Women's Sitting Winners: Sprint:   Oksana Masters;   Andrea Eskau;   Marta Zaynullina
 5 km:   Oksana Masters;   Andrea Eskau;   Marta Zaynullina
 12 km:   Kendall Gretsch;   Andrea Eskau;   Oksana Masters
 Women's Standing Winners: Sprint:   Anna Burmistrova;   Vilde Nilsen;   Natalie Wilkie
 7.5 km:   Natalie Wilkie;   Ekaterina Rumyantseva;   Emily Young
 15 km Freestyle:   Ekaterina Rumyantseva;   Anna Burmistrova;   Liudmyla Liashenko
 Relays 4 x 2.5 km Mixed Relay winners:  ;  ;  
 4 x 2.5 km Open Relay winners:  ;  ;  

2017–18 Tour de Ski
 December 30, 2017 – January 1, 2018: TdS #1 in  Lenzerheide
 Sprint Freestyle winners:  Sergey Ustiugov (m) /  Laurien van der Graaff (f)
 Classical winners:  Dario Cologna (m) /  Ingvild Flugstad Østberg (f)
 Freestyle Pursuit winners:  Dario Cologna (m) /  Ingvild Flugstad Østberg (f)
 January 3 & 4: TdS #2 in  Oberstdorf
 Note: The sprint classical events here was cancelled, due to a thunderstorm.
 Freestyle Mass Start winners:  Emil Iversen (m) /  Ingvild Flugstad Østberg (f)
 January 6 & 7: TdS #3 (final) in  Fiemme Valley
 Classical Mass Start winners:  Alexey Poltoranin (m) /  Heidi Weng (f)
 Freestyle Pursuit winners:  Dario Cologna (m) /  Heidi Weng (f)

2017–18 FIS Cross-Country World Cup
 November 24 – 26, 2017: CCWC #1 in  Kuusamo (Ruka)
 Classical winners:  Johannes Høsflot Klæbo (m) /  Marit Bjørgen (f)
 Sprint Classical winners:  Johannes Høsflot Klæbo (m) /  Stina Nilsson (f)
 Freestyle Pursuit winners:  Maurice Manificat (m) /  Ragnhild Haga (f)
 December 2 & 3, 2017: CCWC #2 in  Lillehammer
 Sprint Classical winners:  Johannes Høsflot Klæbo (m) /  Maiken Caspersen Falla (f)
 Skiathlon winners:  Johannes Høsflot Klæbo (m) /  Charlotte Kalla (f)
 December 9 & 10, 2017: CCWC #3 in  Davos
 Freestyle winners:  Maurice Manificat (m) /  Ingvild Flugstad Østberg (f)
 Sprint Freestyle winners:  Johannes Høsflot Klæbo (m) /  Stina Nilsson (f)
 December 16 & 17, 2017: CCWC #4 in  Toblach
 Classical Pursuit winners:  Alexey Poltoranin (m) /  Ingvild Flugstad Østberg (f)
 Freestyle winners:  Simen Hegstad Krüger (m) /  Charlotte Kalla (f)
 January 13 & 14: CCWC #5 in  Dresden
 Sprint Freestyle winners:  Federico Pellegrino (m) /  Hanna Falk (f)
 Team Sprint Freestyle winners:  (Dietmar Nöckler & Federico Pellegrino) (m) /  (Ida Ingemarsdotter & Maja Dahlqvist) (f)
 January 20 & 21: CCWC #6 in  Planica
 Sprint Classical winners:  Johannes Høsflot Klæbo (m) /  Stina Nilsson (f)
 Classical winners:  Alexey Poltoranin (m) /  Krista Pärmäkoski (f)
 January 27 & 28: CCWC #7 in  Seefeld in Tirol
 Sprint Freestyle winners:  Johannes Høsflot Klæbo (m) /  Sophie Caldwell (f)
 Freestyle Mass Start winners:  Dario Cologna (m) /  Jessie Diggins (f)
 March 3 & 4: CCWC #8 in  Lahti
 Sprint Freestyle winners:  Federico Pellegrino (m) /  Maiken Caspersen Falla (f)
 Classical winners:  Alexey Poltoranin (m) /  Krista Pärmäkoski (f)
 March 7: CCWC #9 in  Drammen
 Sprint Classical winners:  Johannes Høsflot Klæbo (m) /  Maiken Caspersen Falla (f)
 March 10 & 11: CCWC #10 in  Oslo
 Freestyle Mass Start winners:  Dario Cologna (m) /  Marit Bjørgen (f)
 March 16 – 18: CCWC #11 (final) in  Falun
 Sprint Freestyle winners:  Johannes Høsflot Klæbo (m) /  Hanna Falk (f)
 Classical Mass Start winners:  Alexander Bolshunov (m) /  Krista Pärmäkoski (f)
 Freestyle Pursuit winners:  Alexander Bolshunov (m) /  Marit Bjørgen (f)

2017–18 East European Cup (XC)
 November 20 – 24, 2017: Khakasia Cup in  Vershina Tea
 Men's 10 km Classic winner:  Stanislav Volzhentsev
 Women's 5 km Classic winner:  Svetlana Nikolaeva
 Men's 1.7 km Speed Freestyle winner:  Andrey Parfenov
 Women's 1.3 km Speed Freestyle winner:  Tatiana Aleshina
 Men's 1.7 km Classic winner:  Ermil Vokuev
 Women's 1.3 km Classic winner:  Polina Nekrasova
 Men's 15 km Freestyle winner:  Artem Nikolaev
 Women's 10 km Freestyle winner:  Daria Storozhilova
 December 20 – 22, 2017: EEC #2 in  Syanki
 1,6 km Sprint Freestyle winners:  Aliaksandr Saladkou (m) /  Darya Blashko (f)
 Men's 10 km Freestyle winner:  Veselin Tzinzov
 Women's 5 km Freestyle winner:  Maryna Antsybor
 Men's 10 km Classic winner:  Veselin Tzinzov
 Women's 5 km Classic winner:  Tetyana Antypenko
 December 23 – 27, 2017: EEC #3 in  Krasnogorsk
 Event cancelled.
 January 8 – 12: EEC #4 in  Raubichi/Minsk
 Event cancelled.
 February 9: EEC #5 in  Krasnogorsk
 Men's 10 km Classic winner:   Maxim Vylegzhanin
 Women's 5 km Classic winner:  Polina Kalsina
 February 11: EEC #6 in  Moscow
 1.4 km Freestyle winners:  Gleb Retivykh (m) /  Natalya Matveyeva (f)
 February 24 – 28: EEC #7 in  Kononovskaya
 Men's 15 km Freestyle winner:  Artem Maltsev
 Women's 10 km Freestyle winner:  Mariya Istomina
 Men's 1.4 km Classic winner:  Gleb Retivykh
 Women's 1.2 km Classic winner:  Natalya Matveyeva
 Men's Skiathlon winner:  Stanislav Volzhentsev
 Women's Skiathlon winner:  Polina Kalsina

 2017–18 Far East Cross Country Cup (XC)
 December 26 & 27, 2017: FAC #1 in  Otoineppu
 Men's 10 km Classic winners:  Keishin Yoshida (#1) /  Naoto Baba (#2)
 Women's 5 km Classic winners:  Masako Ishida (2 times)
 January 6 & 7: FAC #2 & #3 in  Sapporo
 Men's 10 km Classic winner:  Hiroyuki Miyazawa
 Women's 5 km Classic winner:  Masako Ishida
 1.4 Sprint Classic winners:  Hiroyuki Miyazawa (m) /  Kozue Takizawa (f)
 January 11 & 12: FAC #4 in  Alpensia Resort
 Men's 10 km Classic winner:  Hiroyuki Miyazawa
 Women's 5 km Classic winner:  Lee Chae-won
 Men's 10 km Freestyle winner:  Hiroyuki Miyazawa
 Women's 5 km Freestyle winner:  Lee Chae-won

 2017–18 Scandinavian Cup (XC)
 December 15 – 17, 2017: SCAN #1 in  Vuokatti
 Men's 15 km Sprint Freestyle winner:  Daniel Stock
 Women's 10 km Sprint Freestyle winner:  Tiril Udnes Weng
 Sprint Freestyle winners:  Sindre Bjørnestad Skar (m) /  Tiril Udnes Weng (f)
 Men's 15 km Classic winner:  Ristomatti Hakola
 Women's 10 km Classic winner:  Johanna Matintalo
 January 5 – 7: SCAN #2 in  Piteå
 1 km Sprint Classic winners:  Eirik Brandsdal (m) /  Lotta Udnes Weng (f)
 Men's 15 km Freestyle winner:  Eirik Sverdrup Augdal
 Women's 10 km Freestyle winner:  Charlotte Kalla
 Men's 30 km Classic Must Start winner:  Mattis Stenshagen
 Women's 20 km Classic Must Start winner:  Johanna Matintalo
 February 23 – 25: SCAN #3 in  Trondheim
 Men's 1.5 km Sprint Freestyle winner:  Sindre Bjørnestad Skar
 Women's 1.3 km Sprint Freestyle winner:  Anne Kjersti Kalvå
 Men's 10 km Classic winner:  Paal Golberg
 Women's 5 km Classic winner:  Thea Krokan Murud
 Men's 15 km Freestyle Pursuit winner:  Magne Haga
 Women's 10 km Freestyle Pursuit winner:  Tiril Udnes Weng

2017–18 Slavic Cup (XC)
 December 16 & 17, 2017: SC #1 (Tatra Cup) in  Štrbské pleso
 Men's 1.6 km Classic winner:  Peter Mlynár
 Women's 1.4 km Classic winner:  Kateryna Serdyuk
 Men's 10 km Freestyle winner:  Peter Mlynár
 Women's 7.5 km Freestyle winner:  Tetyana Antypenko
 December 29 & 30, 2017: SC #2 (Memoriál 24 padlých hrdinov SNP) in  Štrbské pleso
 1.6 km Sprint Freestyle winners:  Kamil Bury (m) /  Justyna Kowalczyk (f)
 Men's 15 km Classic winner:  Yury Astapenka
 Women's 10 km Classic winner:  Justyna Kowalczyk
 March 3 & 4: SC #3 in  Wisla
 1.5 km Classic winners:  Mateusz Haratyk (m) /  Eliza Rucka (f)
 Men's 15 km Freestyle winner:  Mateusz Haratyk
 Women's 10 km Freestyle winner:  Eliza Rucka

2018 FIS Balkan Cup (XC)
 January 13 & 14: BC #1 in  Ravna Gora
 Note: Here Sprint Freestyle competitions is cancelled.
 2.5 Freestyle winners:  Edi Dadić (m) /  Antoniya Grigorova-Burgova (f)
 Men's 10 km Classic winner:  Yordan Chuchuganov
 Women's 5 km Classic winner:  Anja Žavbi Kunaver
 January 19 – 21: BC #2 in  Erzurum
 Men's 10 km Classic winners:  Edi Dadić (2 times)
 Women's 5 km Classic winners:  Antoniya Grigorova-Burgova (#1) /  Nansi Okoro (#2)
 Men's 10 km Freestyle winner:  Damir Rastić
 Women's 5 km Freestyle winner:  Sandra Schuetzova
 February 3 & 4: BC #3 in  Naousa
 Men's 10 km Freestyle winners:  Florin Robert Dolhăscu (#1) /  Petrică Hogiu (#2)
 Women's 5 km Freestyle winners:  Maria Danou (#1) /  Nansi Okoro (#2)
 February 28 & March 1: BC #4 in  Zlatibor
 1.2 Freestyle winners:  Nikolay Viyachev (m) /  Nansi Okoro (f)
 Men's 10 km Freestyle winner:  Damir Rastić
 Women's 5 km Freestyle winner:  Nansi Okoro

2017–18 Cross Country Continental Cup (XC)
 December 9 & 10, 2017: OPA #1 in  Les Tuffes
 Note: The second set of 15 km and 10 km cross country events here was cancelled, due to heavy snow.
 Men's 15 km winners:  Ivan Perrillat Boiteux (#1) 
 Women's 10 km winners:  Kateřina Beroušková (#1)
 December 15 – 17, 2017: OPA #2 in  St. Ulrich/Pillersee Valley
 Men's 1.4 km Sprint Freestyle winner:  Simi Hamilton
 Women's 1.2 km Sprint Freestyle winner:  Sophie Caldwell
 Men's 10 km Classic winner:  Alexis Jeannerod
 Women's 5 km Classic winner:  Elena Soboleva
 Men's 15 km Freestyle Must Start winner:  Beda Klee
 Women's 10 km Freestyle Must Start winner:  Julia Belger
 January 5 – 7: OPA #3 in  Campra
 Men's 1.6 km Sprint Classic winner:  Maicol Rastelli
 Women's 1.4 km Sprint Classic winner:  Anne Winkler
 Men's 15 km Freestyle winner:  Clément Arnault
 Women's 10 km Freestyle winner:  Sara Pellegrini
 Skiathlon winners:  Sergio Rigoni (m) /  Sara Pellegrini (f)
 February 16 – 18: OPA #4 in  Zwiesel
 Men's 1.8 km Sprint Classic winner:  Giacomo Gabrielli
 Women's 1.6 km Sprint Classic winner:  Laura Gimmler
 Men's 15 km Classic winner:  Valentin Chauvin
 Women's 10 km Classic winner:  Antonia Fraebel
 Men's 20 km Freestyle Must Start winner:  Robin Duvillard
 Women's 10 km Freestyle Must Start winner:  Antonia Fraebel
 March 3 & 4: OPA #5 in  Cogne
 Men's 15 km Classic winner:  Adrien Backscheider
 Women's 10 km Classic winner:  Rosie Frankowski
 15 km Freestyle Pursuit winners:  Adrien Backscheider (m) /  Rosie Frankowski

2017 FIS Australia & New Zealand Cup (CC)
 July 22 & 23: ANZC #1 in  Perisher Valley
 1 km Freestyle speed:  Phillip Bellingham (m) /  Barbara Jezeršek (f)
 Men's 10 km Classic winner:  Philippe Nicollier
 Women's 5 km Classic winner:  Katerina Paul
 August 19 & 20: ANZC #2 in  Falls Creek (part of Australian Cross Country Skiing Championships)
 1 km Classic winners:  Phillip Bellingham (m) /  Barbara Jezeršek (f)
 Men's 15 km Freestyle winner:  Phillip Bellingham
 Women's 10 km Freestyle winner:  Barbara Jezeršek
 September 7 – 9: ANZC #3 in  Snow Farm
 Men's 10 km Freestyle winner:  Benjamin Lustgarten
 Women's 5 km Freestyle winner:  Jessie Diggins
 1.6 km Sprint Classic winners:  Ben Saxton (m) /  Sophie Caldwell (f)
 Men's 15 km Classic Mass Start winner:  Benjamin Lustgarten
 Women's 10 km Classic Mass Start winner:  Jessie Diggins

2017–18 USA Super Tour (XC)
 December 2 & 3, 2017: UST #1 in  Rendezvous Ski Trails
 1,3 km Sprint Freestyle winners:  Nick Michaud (m) /  Annie Hart (f)
 Men's 15 km Classic winner:  Brian Gregg
 Women's 10 km Classic winner:  Hedda Bångman
 January 26 – 28: UST #2 in  Craftsbury
 1,3 Sprint Classic winners:  Forrest Mahlen (m) /  Kaitlynn Miller (f)
 Men's Individual 10 km Freestyle winner:  David Norris
 Women's Individual 5 km Freestyle winner:  Becca Rorabaugh
 February 15 – 18: UST #3 in  Al Quaal Recreation Area
 1,6 km Sprint Freestyle winners:  Kevin Bolger (m) /  Anikken Gjerde-Alnaes (f)
 Men's 20 km Freestyle Must Start winner:  David Norris
 Women's 15 km Freestyle Must Start winner:  Chelsea Holmes
 Men's 10 km Classic winner:  David Norris
 Women's 5 km Classic winner:  Kaitlynn Miller

2017–18 North American Cup (XC)
 December 9 & 10: NAC #1 in  Vernon
 1,3 km Classic winners:  Bob Thompson (m) /  Kaitlynn Miller (f)
 Men's 15 km Classic winner:  Ian Torchia
 Women's 10 km Classic winner:  Caitlin Patterson
 December 15 – 17: NAC #2 in  Rossland
 Men's 10 km Classic winner:  Brian Gregg
 Women's 5 km Classic winner:  Caitlin Compton Gregg
 1,3 km Freestyle winners:  Julien Locke (m) /  Zina Kocher (f)
 Men's 15 km Freestyle Pursuit winner:  Brian Gregg
 Women's 10 km Freestyle Pursuit winner:  Caitlin Compton Gregg
 January 5 – 10: NAC #3 in  Mont-Sainte-Anne
 Sprint Classique winners:  Julien Locke (m) /  Dahria Beatty (f)
 Skiathlon winners:  Knute Johnsgaard (m) /  Cendrine Browne (f)
 Sprint Freestyle winners:  Jesse Cockney (m) /  Dahria Beatty (f)
 Men's Individual 15 km winner:  Ricardo Izquierdo-Bernier
 Women's Individual 10 km winner:  Cendrine Browne
 January 19 – 21: NAC #4 in  Red Deer, Alberta
 1.2 km Sprint Freestryle winners:  Jesse Cockney (m) /  Olivia Bouffard-Nesbitt (f)
 Men's 15 km Classic Must Start winner:  Andy Shields
 Women's 10 km Classic Must Start winner:  Annika Hicks
 February 2 – 4: NAC #5 in  Nakkertok
 1,4 km Classic winners:  Benjamin Saxton (m) /  Becca Rorabaugh (f)
 Men's 15 km Freestyle winner:  John Hegman
 Women's 10 km Freestyle winner:  Rosie Frankowski
 Men's 15 km Classic Pursuit winner:  David Norris
 Women's 10 km Classic Pursuit winner:  Rosie Frankowski

2017 FIS Roller Skiing World Cup & 2017 FIS Roller Skiing Junior World Cup
 July 7 – 9: RSWC #1 & RSJWC #1 in  Oroslavje
 Men's 16 km Freestyle Must Start:  Emanuele Becchis
 Women's 12 km Freestyle Must Start:  Lisa Bolzan
 Men's Junior 16 km Freestyle Must Start:  Francesco Becchis
 Women's Junior 12 km Freestyle Must Start:  Anna-Maria Dietze
 7 km Cross Uphill winners:  Robin Norum (m) /  Sandra Olsson (f)
 Junior 7 km Cross Uphill winners:  Hugo Jacobsson (m) /  Kristina Axelsson (f)
 0.2 km Speed Freestyle winners:  Dmitriy Voronin (m) /  Anna Bolzan (f)
 Junior 0.2 km Speed Freestyle winners:  Nico Rieckhoff (m) /  Anna Bolzan (f)
 August 3 – 6: RSWC #2 & RSJWC #2 in  Sollefteå (part of 2017 FIS Rollerski World Championships)
 Men's 22.5 km Freestyle winner:  Anders Svanebo
 Women's 18 km Freestyle winner:  Linn Sömskar
 Men's Junior 18 km Freestyle winner:  Alexander Grigoriev
 Women's Junior 13.5 km Freestyle winner:  Anna Zherebyateva
 0.2 km Freestyle winners:  Emanuele Becchis (m) /  Olga Letucheva (f)
 Junior 0.2 km Freestyle winners:  Adam Persson (m) /  Alba Mortagna (f)
 Men's 20 km Freestyle Must Start:  Alexander Bolshunov
 Women's 16 km Freestyle Must Start:  Linn Sömskar
 Men's Junior 16 km Freestyle Must Start:  Leo Johansson
 Women's Junior 12 km Freestyle Must Start:  Anna Zherebyateva
 Team Sprint Freestyle winners:  (Even Sæteren Hippe, Ragnar Bragvin Andresen) (m) /  (Maja Dahlqvist, Linn Sömskar) (f)
 Junior Team Sprint Freestyle winners:  (Mattia Armellini, Francesco Becchis) (m) /  Kristin Austgulen Fosnæs, Amalie Honerud Olsen)
 August 11 – 13: RSWC #3 & RSJWC #3 in  Madona
 0.2 km Speed winners:  Emanuele Becchis (m) /  Alena Procházková (f)
 Junior 0.2 km Speed winners:  Dmitriy Karakosov (m) /  Alba Mortagna (f)
 Men's 7.5 km Classic winner:  Robin Norum
 Men's Junior 7.5 km Classic winner:  Gabriel Strid
 Women's 5 km Classic winner:  Alena Procházková
 Women's Junior 5 km Classic winner:  Yuliia Krol
 Men's 15 km Freestyle Pursuit winner:  Robin Norum
 Men's Junior 15 km Freestyle Pursuit winner:  Raimo Vigants
 Women's 10 km Freestyle Pursuit winner:  Alena Procházková
 Women's Junior 10 km Freestyle Pursuit winner:  Yuliia Krol
 Overall Standing winners:  Robin Norum (m) /  Alena Procházková (f)
 Overall Standing Junior winners:  Raimo Vigants (m) /  Yuliia Krol (f)
 September 8 – 10: RSWC #4 & RSJWC #4 in  Trento/Monte Bondone
 0.165 km Sprint Freestyle winners:  Emanuele Becchis (m) /  Alena Procházková (f)
 Junior 0.165 km Sprint Freestyle winners:  Raimo Vigants (m) /  Alba Mortagna (f)
 Men's 8.5 km Classic winner:  Irineu Esteve Altimiras
 Women's 4.7 km Classic winner:  Helene Söderlund
 Juniors 4.7 km Classic winners:  Luca Curti (m) /  Chiara Becchis (f)
 Men's 10.8 km Freestyle Pursuit winner:  Paul Constantin Pepene
 Women's 6.9 km Freestyle Pursuit winner:  Helene Söderlund
 Juniors 6.9 km Freestyle Pursuit winners:  Gabriel Strid (m) /  Hanna Abrahamsson (f)

Freestyle skiing
2018 Winter Olympics (Freestyle)
 February 9 – 23: Freestyle skiing at the 2018 Winter Olympics
 Men's Aerials winners:   Oleksandr Abramenko;   Jia Zongyang;   Ilya Burov
 Women's Aerials winners:   Hanna Huskova;   Zhang Xin;   Kong Fanyu
 Men's Halfpipe winners:   David Wise;   Alex Ferreira;   Nico Porteous
 Women's Halfpipe winners:   Cassie Sharpe;   Marie Martinod;   Brita Sigourney
 Men's Moguls winners:   Mikaël Kingsbury;   Matt Graham;   Daichi Hara
 Women's Moguls winners:   Perrine Laffont;   Justine Dufour-Lapointe;   Yuliya Galysheva
 Men's Slopestyle winners:   Øystein Bråten;   Nick Goepper;   Alex Beaulieu-Marchand
 Women's Slopestyle winners:   Sarah Höfflin;   Mathilde Gremaud;   Isabel Atkin
 Men's Ski Cross winners:   Brady Leman;   Marc Bischofberger;   Sergey Ridzik
 Women's Ski Cross winners:   Kelsey Serwa;   Brittany Phelan;   Fanny Smith

World and Continental events
 March 2: 2018 Asian Cup (Halfpipe) in  Pyeongchang
 Halfpipe winners:  Lee Kang-bok (m) /  Jang Yu-jin (f)
 FIS Junior Freestyle Ski World Championships

2017–18 FIS Freestyle Skiing World Cup
 August 26, 2017 – March 25, 2018: 2017–18 FIS Freestyle Skiing World Cup Schedule

Moguls and Aerials
 December 9, 2017: MAWC #1 in  Rukatunturi (Kuusamo)
 Moguls winners:  Mikaël Kingsbury (m) /  Britteny Cox (f)
 December 16 & 17, 2017: MAWC #2 in  Genting Resort Secret Garden (Chongli District. Zhangjiakou)
 Men's aerials winner:  Jia Zongyang (2 times) 
 Women's aerials winners:  Hanna Huskova (#1) /  Danielle Scott (#2)
 Team aerials winners:  (Xu Mengtao, Qi Guangpu, & Jia Zongyang)
 December 21 & 22, 2017: MAWC #3 in  Thaiwoo (Chongli District, Zhangjiakou)
 Men's moguls winner:  Mikaël Kingsbury (2 times)
 Women's moguls winners:  Jaelin Kauf (#1) /  Yuliya Galysheva (#2)
 January 6: MAWC #4 in  Moscow
 Aerials winners:  Anton Kushnir (m) /  Kiley McKinnon (f)
 January 6: MAWC #5 in  Calgary
 Moguls winners:  Mikaël Kingsbury (m) /  Britteny Cox (f)
 January 10 – 12: MAWC #6 in  Deer Valley
 Men's moguls winner:  Mikaël Kingsbury (2 times)
 Women's moguls winners:  Perrine Laffont (#1) /  Jaelin Kauf (#2)
 Aerials winners:  Maxim Burov (m) /  Xu Mengtao (f)
 January 19 & 20: MAWC #7 in  Lake Placid, New York
 Men's aerials winners:  Jia Zongyang (#1) /  Maxim Burov (#2)
 Women's aerials winners:  Lydia Lassila (#1) /  Xu Mengtao (#2)
 January 20: MAWC #8 in  Mont Tremblant Resort
 Moguls winners:  Ikuma Horishima (m) /  Justine Dufour-Lapointe (f)
 March 3 & 4: MAWC #9 in  Tazawako
 Moguls winners:  Ikuma Horishima (m) /  Perrine Laffont (f)
 Dual moguls winners:  Ikuma Horishima (m) /  Tess Johnson (f)
 March 10: MAWC #10 in  Airolo
 Event cancelled.
 March 18: MAWC #11 (final) in  Megève
 Dual moguls winners:  Mikaël Kingsbury (m) /  Jaelin Kauf (f)

Half-pipe, Big air, and Slopestyle
 August 26 – September 1, 2017: HB&SWC #1 in  Cardrona Alpine Resort
 Slopestyle winners:  James Woods (m) /  Kelly Sildaru (f)
 Half-pipe winners:  Alex Ferreira (m) /  Cassie Sharpe (f)
 November 3, 2017: HB&SWC #2 in  Copenhagen
 Event cancelled.
 November 18, 2017: HB&SWC #3 in  Milan
 Big Air winners:  Elias Ambühl (m) /  Coline Ballet Baz (f)
 November 24 – 26, 2017: HB&SWC #4 in  Stubai Alps
 Slopestyle winners:  Øystein Bråten (m) /  Jennie-Lee Burmansson (f)
 December 1, 2017: HB&SWC #5 in  Mönchengladbach
 Big Air winners:  Christian Nummedal (m) /  Giulia Tanno (f)
 December 6 & 8, 2017: HB&SWC #6 in  Copper Mountain
 Half-pipe winners:  David Wise (m) /  Marie Martinod (f)
 December 20 & 22, 2017: HB&SWC #7 in  Genting Resort Secret Garden (Chongli District, Zhangjiakou)
 Half-pipe winners:  Thomas Krief (m) /  ZHANG Kexin (f)
 December 21 – 23, 2017: HB&SWC #8 in  Font-Romeu
 Slopestyle winners:  Oscar Wester (m) /  Tess Ledeux (f)
 January 10 – 13: HB&SWC #9 in  Snowmass
 Half-pipe winners:  David Wise (m) /  Cassie Sharpe (f)
 Slopestyle winners:  Andri Ragettli (m) /  Johanne Killi (f)
 January 17 – 21: HB&SWC #10 in  Mammoth Mountain Ski Area
 Half-pipe winners:  Kyle Smaine (m) /  Brita Sigourney (f)
 Slopestyle winners:  Teal Harle (m) /  Tiril Sjåstad Christiansen (f)
 March 2 & 3: HB&SWC #11 in  Silvaplana
 Slopestyle winners:  Alexander Hall (m) /  Tess Ledeux (f)
 March 14 & 16: HB&SWC #12 in  Seiser Alm
 Slopestyle winners:  Nicholas Goepper (m) /  Caroline Claire (f)
 March 21 & 22: HB&SWC #13 in  Tignes
 Half-pipe winners:  Noah Bowman (m) /  Cassie Sharpe (f)
 March 22 & 24: HB&SWC #14 (final) in  Stoneham Mountain Resort
 Note: The slopestyle event here has been cancelled.
 Big Air winners:  Christian Nummedal (m) /  Dara Howell (f)

Ski cross
 December 7 & 9, 2017: SCWC #1 in  Val Thorens
 Note: The second set of ski cross events here was cancelled, due to heavy snow.
 Ski cross winners:  Christopher Del Bosco (m) /  Sandra Näslund (f)
 December 12, 2017: SCWC #2 in  Arosa
 Ski cross winners:  Viktor Andersson (m) /  Sandra Näslund (f)
 December 15, 2017: SCWC #3 in  Montafon
 Ski cross winners:  Sergey Ridzik (m) /  Fanny Smith (f)
 December 20 – 22, 2017: SCWC #4 in  Innichen
 Men's ski cross winner:  Marc Bischofberger (2 times)
 Women's ski cross winners:  Heidi Zacher (#1) /  Sandra Näslund (#2)
 January 12 – 14: SCWC #5 in  Idre
 Men's ski cross winners:  Alex Fiva (#1) /  Jean-Frédéric Chapuis (#2)
 Women's ski cross winner:  Sandra Näslund (2 times)
 January 19 & 20: SCWC #6 in  Nakiska
 Ski cross winners:  Paul Eckert (m) /  Sandra Näslund (f)
 March 2 – 4: SCWC #7 (final) in  Sunny Valley Ski Resort (Miass)
 Men's ski cross winners:  Jonas Lenherr (#1) /  Kevin Drury (#2)
 Women's ski cross winners:  Fanny Smith (#1) /  Sandra Näslund (#2)
 March 17: SCWC #8 in  Megève
 Event cancelled.

 2017–18 European Cup (FS)
 November 26, 2017: ECFS #1 in  St. Leonhard im Pitztal
 Ski Cross winners:  Jonas Lenherr (m) /  Georgia Simmerling (f)
 December 1 & 2, 2017: ECFS #2 in  Rukatunturi (Super Continental Cup)
 Men's Aerials winners:  Oleksandr Abramenko (2 times)
 Women's Aerials winners:  Laura Peel (#1) /  Danielle Scott (#2)
 December 9 – 16, 2017: ECFS #3 in  Kaprun
 Halfpipe winners:  Lukas Müllauer (m) /  Elisabeth Gram (f)
 Slopestyle winners:  Petter Ulsletten (m) /  Sandra Moestue Eie (f)
 December 21 – 23, 2017: ECFS #4 in  Val Thorens
 Men's Ski Cross winners:  Cornel Renn (#1) /  Ryan Regez (#2)
 Women's Ski Cross winners:  Zoé Cheli (2 times)
 January 17 – 20: ECFS #4 in  Megève
 Men's Moguls winners:  Oskar Elofsson (2 times) 
 Women's Moguls winners:  Clara Månsson (2 times) 
 Dual Moguls winners:  Oskar Elofsson (m) /  Ksenia Kuznetsova (f)
 January 19 & 20: ECFS #5 in  Idre Fjäll
 Men's Ski Cross winners:  Franz Pietzko (2 times) 
 Women's Ski Cross winners:  Alexandra Edebo (2 times)
 January 25 & 26: ECFS #6 in  Lenk im Simmental
 Men's Ski Cross winners:  Ryan Regez (2 times)
 Women's Ski Cross winners:  Alexandra Edebo (2 times)
 January 26 –  28: ECFS #7 in  St Anton am Arlberg
 Event was cancelled.
 January 31 – February 1: ECFS #8 in  Krasnoe Ozero
 Moguls winners:  Andrey Uglovski (m) /  Anastasiia Smirnova (f)
 Dual Moguls winners:  Oskar Elofsson (m) /  Anastasiia Smirnova (f)
 January 31 – February 3: ECFS #9 in  St. Francois
 Men's Ski Cross winners:  Jean-Frédéric Chapuis (#1) /  Morgan Guipponi Barfety (#2)
 Women's Ski Cross winners:  Alizée Baron (2 times)
 February 4 & 5: ECFS #10 in  Jyväskylä
 Moguls winners:  Topi Kanninen (m) /  Ksenia Kuznetsova (f)
 Dual Moguls winners:  Oskar Elofsson (m) /  Frida Lundblad (f)
 February 6 & 7: ECFS #11 in  Méribel
 Slopestyle winners:  Javier Lliso (m) /  Tora Johansen (f)
 February 10 & 11: ECFS #12 in  Åre
 Moguls winners:  Topi Kanninen (m) /  Clara Månsson (f)
 Dual Moguls winners:  Loke Nilsson (m) /  Ksenia Kuznetsova (f)
 February 16 – 18: ECFS #13 in  Minsk
 Men's Aerials winners:  Dzmitry Mazurkevich (#1) /  Pavel Dik (#2) /  Kirill Samorodov (#3)
 Women's Aerials winners:  Carol Bouvard (#1 & #3) /  Emma Weiß (#2)
 Team Aerials winners:  2 (Denis Osipau, Artsiom Bashlakou, Yana Yarmashevich)
 February 23 – 25: ECFS #14 in  Davos
 Big Air winners:  Kim Gubser (m) /  Sophia Insam (f)
 Halfpipe winners:  Mario Grob (m) /  Isabelle Hanssen (f)
 February 24 & 25: ECFS #15 in  Grasgehren
 Men's Ski Cross winners:  Ryan Regez (2 times)
 Women's Ski Cross winners:  Alexandra Edebo (#1) /  Abby McEwen (#2)
 March 1 – 3: ECFS #16 in  Mittenwald
 Men's Ski Cross winners:  Ryan Regez (2 times)
 Women's Ski Cross winners:  Zoe Chore (#1) /  Alexandra Edebo (#2)
 March 2 & 3: ECFS #17 in  Götschen
 Big Air winners:  Hannes Rudigier (m) /  Sophia Insam (f)
 March 3 & 4: ECFS #18 in  Krispl
 Men's Moguls winners:  Oskar Elofsson (#1) /  Nikita Novitckii (#2)
 Women's Moguls winners:  Frida Lundblad (2 times)

 2017–18 North American Cup (FS)
 December 15 & 16, 2017: NAC #1 in  Copper Mountain
 Men's Halfpipe winners:  Cassidy Jarrell (#1) /  Hunter Hess (#2)
 Women's Halfpipe winners:  Abigale Hansen (2 times)
 December 16 & 17, 2017: NAC #2 in  Utah Olympic Park
 Men's Aerials winners:  Justin Schoenefeld (#1) /  Zachary Surdell (#2)
 Women's Aerials winners:  Karena Elliott (#1) /  Madison Varmette (#2)
 January 21 – 23: NAC #3 in  Nakiska
 Men's Ski Cross winners:  Reece Howden (2 times) 
 Women's Ski Cross winners:  Reina Umehara (2 times)
 January 27 & 28: NAC #4 in  Val Saint-Côme
 Moguls winners:  Kerrian Chunlaud (m) /  Berkley Brown (f)
 Dual Moguls winners:  Dylan Walczyk (m) /  Avital Shimko (f)
 February 3 & 4: NAC #5 in  Killington Ski Resort
 Moguls winners:  Dylan Walczyk (m) /  Valerie Gilbert (f)
 Dual Moguls winners:  Dylan Walczyk (m) /  Avital Shimko (f)
 February 9 – 11: NAC #6 in  Calgary
 Slopestyle winners:  Philippe Langevin (m) /  Megan Oldham (f)
 Men's Halfpipe winners:  Birk Irving (2 times)
 Women's Halfpipe winners:  Abigale Hansen (#1) /  Carly Margulies (#2)
 February 12 – 15: NAC #7 in  Sunday River
 Men's Ski Cross winners:  Reece Howden (#1) /  Mathieu Leduc (#2)
 Women's Ski Cross winners:  Tiana Gairns (2 times) 
 February 17 & 18: NAC #8 in  Lake Placid
 Event was cancelled.
 February 17 – 19: NAC #9 in  Calabogie Peaks
 Men's Ski Cross winners:  Brant Crossan (#1) /  Zach Belczyk (#2)
 Women's Ski Cross winners:  Zoe Chore (#1) /  Abby McEwen (#2)
 February 23 & 24: NAC #10 in  Le Relais, QC
 Men's Aerials winners:  Justin Schoenefeld (2 times) 
 Women's Aerials winners:  Kaila Kuhn (2 times) 
 February 22 – 24: NAC #11 in  Aspen / Buttermilk
 Big Air winners:  Noah Morrison (m) /  Rell Harwood (f)
 Slopestyle winners:  William Borm (m) /  Marin Hamill (f)
 Halfpipe winners:  Birk Irving (m) /  Abigale Hansen (f)
 February 24 & 25: NAC #12 in  Calgary, AB
 Moguls winners:  Laurent Dumais (m) /  Avital Shimko (f)
 Dual Moguls winners:  Laurent Dumais (m) /  Elizabeth O'Connell (f)
 February 27 – March 4: NAC #13 in  Park City
 Moguls winners:  Hunter Bailey (m) /  Hannah Soar (f)
 Dual Moguls winners:  Jesse Andringa (m) /  Berkley Brown (f)
 March 1 & 2: NAC #14 in  Utah Olympic Park
 Men's Aerials winners:  Jasper Holcomb (#1) /  Harrison Smith (#2)
 Women's Aerials winners:  Madison Varmette (#1) /  Kaila Kuhn (#2)

 2017 South American Cup (FS)
 August 11 & 12: SAC #1 in  La Parva #1
 Slopestyle #1 winners:  Alex Hall (m) /  Melanie Kraizel (f)
 Slopestyle #2 winners:  Nathan Miceli (m) /  Dominique Ohaco (f)
 August 24 – 26: SAC #2 in  La Parva #2
 This event is cancelled.
 September 17 & 18: SAC #3 in  Cerro Catedral
 Big Air #1 winners:  Nahuel Medrano (m) /  Josefina Vitiello (f)
 Big Air #2 winners:  Ivan Kuray (m) /  Maria Cabanillas (f)

2017 Australia & New Zealand Cup (FS)
 July 31 – August 4: ANCFS #1 in  Mount Buller #1
 Ski Cross #1 winners:  Doug Crawford (m) /  Sami Kennedy-Sim (f)
 Ski Cross #2 winners:  Doug Crawford (m) /  Sami Kennedy-Sim (f)
 August 15 – 17: ANCFS #2 in  Cardrona (part of FIS Continental Cup)
 Halfpipe winners:  Nico Porteous (m) /  Sabrina Cakmakli (f)
 Slopestyle winners:  Birk Ruud (m) /  Mee-hyun Lee (f)
 August 24 – 27: ANCFS #3 in  Mount Hotham
 Ski Cross #1 winners:  Jamie Prebble (m) /  Sami Kennedy-Sim (f)
 Ski Cross #2 winners:  Tyler Wallasch (m) /  Sami Kennedy-Sim (f)
 August 29 – 30: ANCFS #4 in  Perisher Ski Resort
 Moguls #1 winners:  Matthew Graham (m) /  Perrine Laffont (f)
 Moguls #2 winners:  Mikaël Kingsbury (m) /  Britteny Cox (f)
 September 2: ANCFS #5 in  Mount Buller #2
 Dual Moguls winners:  Matt Graham (m) /  Nicole Parks (f)

Nordic combined
2018 Winter Olympics (NC)
 February 14, 20, & 22: Nordic combined at the 2018 Winter Olympics
 Men's individual large hill/10 km winners:   Johannes Rydzek;   Fabian Rießle;   Eric Frenzel
 Men's individual normal hill/10 km winners:   Eric Frenzel;   Akito Watabe;   Lukas Klapfer
 Men's team large hill/4 x 5 km winners:  ;  ;  

2018 FIS Junior World Ski Championships
 January 30 – February 3: 2018 FIS Junior World Ski Championships (NC) in  Kandersteg-Goms, Valais
 Men's individual winners:  Ondrej Pazout (#1) /  Vid Vrhovnik (#2)
 Men's team winners:  (Johannes Lamparter, Florian Dagn, Dominik Terzer, & Mika Vermeulen)

2017–18 FIS Nordic Combined World Cup
 November 24 – 26, 2017: NCWC #1 in  Rukatunturi (Kuusamo)
 Men's individual winners:  Espen Andersen (#1) /  Akito Watabe (#2) /  Johannes Rydzek (#3)
 December 2 & 3, 2017: NCWC #2 in  Lillehammer
 Men's individual winner:  Espen Andersen
 Men's team winners:  (Jan Schmid, Espen Andersen, Jarl Magnus Riiber, & Jørgen Graabak)
 December 16 & 17, 2017: NCWC #3 in  Ramsau am Dachstein
 Men's individual winners:  Eric Frenzel (#1) /  Fabian Rießle (#2)
 January 6 & 7: NCWC #4 in  Otepää
 Event cancelled.
 January 12 – 14: NCWC #5 in  Fiemme Valley
 Men's individual winners:  Jørgen Graabak (#1) /  Jan Schmid (#2)
 Men's team winners:  (Eric Frenzel & Vinzenz Geiger)
 January 20 & 21: NCWC #6 in  Chaux-Neuve
 Men's individual winner:  Jan Schmid
 Men's team winners:  (Jan Schmid, Espen Andersen, Jarl Magnus Riiber, & Jørgen Graabak)
 January 26 – 28: NCWC #7 in  Seefeld in Tirol
 Men's individual winner:  Akito Watabe (3 times)
 February 3 & 4: NCWC #8 in  Hakuba
 Men's individual winners:  Akito Watabe (#1) /  Jan Schmid (#2)
 March 3 & 4: NCWC #9 in  Lahti
 Men's individual winner:  Johannes Rydzek
 Men's team winners:  (Wilhelm Denifl & Bernhard Gruber)
 March 10: NCWC #10 in  Oslo
 Men's individual winner:  Akito Watabe
 March 13 & 14: NCWC #11 in  Trondheim
 Men's individual winners:  Eric Frenzel (#1) /  Fabian Rießle (#2)
 March 17 & 18: NCWC #12 in  Klingenthal
 Men's individual winner:  Fabian Rießle (2 times)
 March 24 & 25: NCWC #13 (final) in  Schonach im Schwarzwald
 Men's individual winner:  Akito Watabe (2 times)

2017–18 Continental Cup (NK) 
 December 15 – 27, 2017: CCNK #1 in  Steamboat Springs, Colorado
 Men's winners:  Mikko Kokslien (3 times)
 January 5 – 7: CCNK #2 in  Klingenthal
 Men's winners:  Antoine Gérard (#1) /  Franz-Josef Rehrl (#2) /  François Braud (#3)
 January 6 & 7: CCNK #3 in  Otepää
 This event is cancelled.
 January 12 – 14: CCNK #4 in  Rukatunturi
 Men's winners:  Bernhard Flaschberger (#1) /  Sindre Ure Søtvik (#2) /  Thomas Jöbstl (#3)
 January 20 & 21: CCNK #5 in  Rena
 Men's winners:  Thomas Jöbstl (#1) /  Dominik Terzer (#2)
 Women's winners:  Stefaniya Nadymova (#1) /  Ayane Miyazaki (#2)
 February 3 & 4: CCNK #6 in  Planica
 Men's winners:  Bryan Fletcher (2 times)
 February 9 – 11: CCNK #7 in  Eisenerz
 Men's winners:  Mika Vermeulen (#1) /  Mikko Kokslien (#2)
 March 9 – 11: CCNK #8 in  Nizhny Tagil
 Men's winners:  Lukas Runggaldier (#1) /  Laurent Muhlethaler (#2)
 Women's winners:  Stefaniya Nadymova (2 times)
 Men's Mass Start winner:  Bernhard Flaschberger

2017 Grand Prix (NK)
 August 19 & 20, 2017: GPNK #1 in  Oberwiesenthal
 Men's winner:  Mario Seidl
 Team winners:  I (Tomáš Portyk, Miroslav Dvořák)
 August 23, 2017: GPNK #2 in  Tschagguns
 Men's winner:  Fabian Rießle
 August 25 & 26, 2017: GPNK #3 in  Oberstdorf
 Men's winners:  Eric Frenzel (#1) /  Mario Seidl (#2)
 September 30 & October 1, 2017: GPNK #4 in  Planica
 Men's winners:  Magnus Moan (2 times)

 2017–18 OPA Alpen Cup (NK)
Summer
 August 7, 2017: ACNK #1 in  Klingenthal
 Women's winner:  Lena Prinoth
 August 11, 2017: ACNK #2 in  Bischofsgrün
 Women's winner:  Jenny Nowak
 September 9 & 10, 2017: ANCK #3 in  Kandersteg
 Men's winners:  Florian Dagn (#1) /  Lilian Vaxelaire (#2)
 September 23, 2017: ANCK #4 in  Predazzo
 Women's winner:  Lena Prinoth
 September 23 & 24, 2017: ANCK #5 in  Winterberg
 Men's winners:  Justin Moczarski (2 times)
Winter
 December 16 & 17, 2017: ANCK #6 in  Seefeld in Tirol
 Men's winners:  Ondřej Pažout (#1) /  Edgar Vallet (#2)
 Women's winners:  Jenny Nowak (2 times)
 January 13 & 14: ANCK #7 in  Schonach
 Men's winners:  Mika Vermeulen (2 times)
 Women's winners:  Jenny Nowak (2 times)
 February 17 & 18: ANCK #8 in  Baiersbronn
 Men's winners:  Johannes Lamparter (#1) /  Florian Dagn (#2)
 Women's winners:  Annika Sieff (#1) /  Jenny Nowak (#2)
 February 24 & 25: ANCK #9 in  Planica
 Men's winners:  Iacopo Bortolas (#1) /  Johannes Lamparter (#2)
 Women's winners:  Marie Naehring (#1) /  Jenny Nowak (#2)
 Teams winners:  (Stefan Rettenegger, Fabian Hafner, Manuel Einkemmer, Johannes Lamparter) (m) /  (Sophia Maurus, Marie Naehring, Jenny Nowak)
 March 10 & 11: ANCK #10 in  Chaux-Neuve
 Men's winners:  Johannes Lamparter (2 times) 
 Women's winners:  Annika Sieff (2 times)

Ski jumping
2018 Winter Olympics (SJ)
 February 10 – 19: Ski jumping at the 2018 Winter Olympics
 Men's Individual Normal Hill winners:   Andreas Wellinger;   Johann André Forfang;   Robert Johansson
 Men's Individual Large Hill winners:   Kamil Stoch;   Andreas Wellinger;   Robert Johansson
 Men's Team Large Hill winners:  ;  ;  
 Women's Individual Normal Hill winners:   Maren Lundby;   Katharina Althaus;   Sara Takanashi

World ski jumping championships
 January 19 – 21: FIS Ski Flying World Championships 2018 in  Oberstdorf
 Men's individual winner:  Daniel-André Tande
 Men's team winners:  (Robert Johansson, Andreas Stjernen, Johann André Forfang, & Daniel-André Tande)
 February 1 – 4:  2018 FIS Junior World Ski Championships (SJ) in  Kandersteg-Goms, Valais
 Individual winners:  Marius Lindvik (m) /  Nika Kriznar (f)
 Men's team winners:  (Philipp Raimund, Justin Lisso, Cedrik Weigel, & Constantin Schmid)
 Women's team winners:  (Jerneja Brecl, Nika Kriznar, Katra Komar, & Ema Klinec)
 Mixed team winners:  (Silje Opseth, Fredrik Villumstad, Anna Odine Strøm, & Marius Lindvik)

2017–18 Four Hills Tournament
 December 29 & 30, 2017: FHT #1 in  Oberstdorf
 Winner:  Kamil Stoch
 December 31, 2017 & January 1, 2018: FHT #2 in  Garmisch-Partenkirchen
 Winner:  Kamil Stoch
 January 3 & 4: FHT #3 in  Innsbruck
 Winner:  Kamil Stoch
 January 5 & 6: FHT #4 (final) in  Bischofshofen
 Winner:  Kamil Stoch

Raw Air 2018
 March 9 – 11: RA #1 in  Oslo (SJWC #18)
 Individual winners:  Daniel-André Tande (m) /  Maren Lundby (f)
 Men's team winners:  (Daniel-André Tande, Andreas Stjernen, Johann André Forfang, & Robert Johansson)
 March 12 & 13: RA #2 in  Lillehammer (SJWC #19)
 Men's individual winner:  Kamil Stoch
 March 14 & 15: RA #3 in  Trondheim (SJWC #20)
 Men's individual winner:  Kamil Stoch
 March 16 – 18: RA #4 (final) in  Vikersund (SJWC #21)
 Men's individual winner:  Robert Johansson
 Men's team winners:  (Daniel-André Tande, Johann André Forfang, Andreas Stjernen, & Robert Johansson)

2017–18 FIS Ski Jumping World Cup
 November 17 – 19, 2017: SJWC #1 in  Wisła
 Men's individual winner:  Junshirō Kobayashi
 Men's team winners:  (Johann André Forfang, Anders Fannemel, Daniel-André Tande, & Robert Johansson)
 November 24 – 26, 2017: SJWC #2 in  Ruka (Kuusamo)
 Men's individual winner:  Jernej Damjan
 Men's team winners:  (Robert Johansson, Anders Fannemel, Daniel-André Tande, & Johann André Forfang)
 November 30 – December 3, 2017: SJWC #3 in  Lillehammer
 Women's individual winners:  Maren Lundby (#1) /  Katharina Althaus (#2; 2 times)
 December 1 – 3, 2017: SJWC #4 in  Nizhny Tagil
 Men's individual winners:  Richard Freitag (#1) /  Andreas Wellinger (#2)
 December 9 & 10, 2017: SJWC #5 in  Titisee-Neustadt
 Men's individual winner:  Richard Freitag
 Men's team winners:  (Robert Johansson, Daniel-André Tande, Anders Fannemel, & Johann André Forfang)
 December 15 – 17, 2017: SJWC #6 in  Engelberg
 Men's individual winners:  Anders Fannemel (#1) /  Richard Freitag (#2)
 December 15 – 17, 2017: SJWC #7 in  Hinterzarten
 Women's individual winner:  Maren Lundby
 Women's team winners:  (Yuki Ito, Kaori Iwabuchi, Yūka Setō, & Sara Takanashi)
 January 5 – 7: SJWC #8 in  Râșnov
 Event cancelled (moved to March 2 – 4).
 January 12 – 14: SJWC #9 in  Sapporo
 Women's individual winner:  Maren Lundby (2 times)
 January 12 – 14: SJWC #10 in  Tauplitz-Bad Mitterndorf
 Note: The second men's individual event was cancelled.
 Men's individual winner:  Andreas Stjernen
 January 18 – 21: SJWC #11 in  Zaō, Miyagi
 Women's individual winner:  Maren Lundby (2 times)
 Women's team winners:  (Kaori Iwabuchi, Yūka Setō, Yuki Ito, & Sara Takanashi)
 January 26 – 28: SJWC #12 in  Ljubno ob Savinji
 Women's individual winners:  Maren Lundby (#1) /  Daniela Iraschko-Stolz (#2)
 January 26 – 28: SJWC #13 in  Zakopane
 Men's individual winner:  Anže Semenič
 Men's team winners:  (Maciej Kot, Stefan Hula Jr., Dawid Kubacki, & Kamil Stoch)
 February 2 – 4: SJWC #14 in  Hinzenbach
 Event cancelled.
 February 2 – 4: SJWC #15 in  Willingen
 Men's individual winners:  Daniel-André Tande (#1) /  Johann André Forfang (#2)
 March 2 – 4: SJWC #16 in  Lahti
 Men's individual winner:  Kamil Stoch
 Men's team winners:  (Karl Geiger, Markus Eisenbichler, Richard Freitag, & Andreas Wellinger)
 March 2 – 4: SJWC #17 in  Râșnov
 Women's individual winners:  Katharina Althaus (#1) /  Maren Lundby (#2)
 March 22 – 25: SJWC #22 in  Planica
 Men's individual winner:  Kamil Stoch (2 times)
 Men's team winners:  (Daniel-André Tande, Andreas Stjernen, Robert Johansson, & Johann André Forfang)
 March 23 – 25: SJWC #23 (final) in  Oberstdorf
 Women's individual winner:  Sara Takanashi (2 times)

2017–18 FIS Ski Jumping Continental Cup
Summer
 July 7 & 8, 2017: #1 in  Kranj
 Men's winners:  Klemens Murańka (2 times)
 August 18, 2017: #2 in  Szczyrk
 Men's winner:  Aleksander Zniszczoł
 August 18 & 19, 2017: #3 in  Oberwiesenthal
 Women's winners:  Ramona Straub (#1) /  Kamila Karpiel (#2)
 August 18 & 19: #4  Frenštát pod Radhoštěm
 Women's winners:  Yuki Ito (#1) /  Sara Takanashi (#2)
 August 19, 2017: #5 in  Wisła
 Men's winner:  Miran Zupančič
 August 20, 2017: #6 in  Frenštát pod Radhoštěm (Men's only)
 Men's winner:  Maximilian Steiner
 September 9 & 10, 2017: #7 in  Stams
 Men's winners:  Stefan Kraft (#1) /  Daniel Huber (#2)
 September 16 & 17, 2017: #8 in  Trondheim
 Men's winners:  Pius Paschke (#1) /  Timi Zajc (#2)
 Women's winners:  Juliane Seyfarth (2 times)
 September 23 & 24, 2017: #9 in  Râșnov
 Men's winners:  Pius Paschke (2 times)
 September 30 & October 1, 2017: #10 in  Klingenthal
 Men's winners:  Joachim Hauer (#1) /  Tilen Bartol (#2)
Winter
 December 9 & 10, 2017: CC#11 in  Whistler
 Men's winners:  Tomasz Pilch (#1) /  Andreas Wank (#2)
 December 15 & 16, 2017: CC #12 in  Notodden
 Women's winners:  Lidiia Iakovleva (#1) /  Aleksandra Barantceva (#2)
 December 16 & 17, 2017: CC #13 in  Rukatunturi
 Men's winners:  Tomasz Pilch (#1) /  Jurij Tepeš (#2)
 December 27 & 28, 2017: CC #14 in  Engelberg
 Men's winners:  Jonathan Learoyd (#1) /  Ulrich Wohlgenannt (#2)
 January 6 & 7: CC #15 in  Titisee-Neustadt
 Men's winners:  Marius Lindvik (#1) /  David Siegel (#2)
 January 10 & 11: CC #16 in  Bischofshofen
 Men's winners:  Tom Hilde (#1) /  David Siegel (#2)
 January 20: CC #17 in  Erzurum
 Men's winners:  David Siegel (#1) /  Anže Lanišek (#2)
 January 20 & 21: CC #18 in  Planica #1
 Women's winners:  Daniela Iraschko-Stolz (2 times)
 January 26 & 29: CC #19 in  Sapporo
 Men's winners:  Robert Kranjec (2 times) /  Daniel Huber (#2)
 February 3 & 4: CC #19 in  Planica #2
 Men's winners:  Anže Lanišek (2 times)
 February 10 & 11: CC #20 in  Iron Mountain, Michigan
 Men's winners:  Marius Lindvik (#1) /  Halvor Egner Granerud (#2)

2017 FIS Ski Jumping Grand Prix
 July 13 – 15: #1 in  Wisła
 Men's winner:  Dawid Kubacki
 Teams winners:  (Piotr Żyła, Kamil Stoch, Dawid Kubacki, Maciej Kot)
 July 28 & 29: #2 in  Hinterzarten
 Men's winner:  Dawid Kubacki
 August 10 – 12: #3 in  Courchevel
 Winners:  Dawid Kubacki (m) /  Katharina Althaus (f)
 August 25 – 27: #4 in  Hakuba
 Men's winners:  Junshirō Kobayashi (2 times)
 September 8 – 10: #5 in  Chaykovsky
 Men's winners:  Anže Lanišek (2 times)
 Women's winners:  Sara Takanashi (2 times)
 September 30 – October 1: #6 in  Hinzenbach
 Men's winners:  Dawid Kubacki
 October 2 & 3: #7 in  Klingenthal
 Men's winners:  Dawid Kubacki

2017–18 FIS Ski Jumping Alpen Cup
Summer
 August 6 & 7, 2017: OPA #1 in  Klingenthal
 Women's winners:  Julia Mühlbacher (#1) /  Alexandra Seifert (#2)
 August 9 & 10, 2017: OPA #2 in  Pöhla
 Women's winners:  Lisa Eder (2 times)
 August 11 & 12, 2017: OPA #3 in  Bischofsgrün (Women's only)
 Women's winners:  Katra Komar (#1) /  Lisa Eder (#2)
 September 9 & 10, 2017: OPA #4 in  Kandersteg
 Men's winners:  Aljaž Osterc (#1) /  Sandro Hauswirth (#2)
 September 23 & 24, 2017: OPA #5 in  Predazzo
 Men's winners:  Justin Lisso (2 times)
 Women's winners:  Océane Paillard (2 times)
Winter
 December 15 – 17, 2017: OPA #6 in  Seefeld in Tirol
 Note: Second women's event here is cancelled.
 Men's winners:  Clemens Leitner (#1) /  Sandro Hauswirth (#2)
 Women's winners:  Jenny Nowak (#1)
 January 13 & 14: OPA #7 in  Hinterzarten
 Men's winners:  Jan Hoerl (2 times)
 Women's winners:  Jerneja Brecl (2 times)

2017–18 FIS Cup
Summer
 July 1 & 2, 2017: FC #1 in  Villach
 Men's winners:  Timi Zajc (#1) /  Lukas Wagner (#2)
 Women's winners:  Nika Križnar (2 times)
 August 12 & 13, 2017: FC #2 in  Kuopio 
 Men's winners:  Timi Zajc (2 times)
 September 16 & 17, 2017: FC #3 in  Kandersteg
 Men's winners:  Timi Zajc (#1) /  Masamitsu Itō (#2)
 Women's winners:  Léa Lemare (#1) /  Nika Križnar (#2)
 September 21 & 22, 2017: FC #4 in  Râșnov
 Men's winners:  Markus Rupitsch (#1) /  Dominik Mayländer (#2)
 Women's winners:  Daniela Haralambie (2 times)
Winter
 December 7 & 8, 2017: FC #5 in  Whistler
 Men's winners:  Elias Tollinger (#1) /  Nejc Dežman (#2)
 Women's winners:  Abigail Strate (2 times)
 December 15 & 16, 2017: FC #6 in  Notodden
 Men's winners:  Sondre Ringen (#1) /  Ulrich Wohlgenannt (#2)
 January 13 & 14: FC #7 in  Zakopane
 Men's winners:  Maximilian Steiner (#1) /  Stefan Huber (#2)
 January 20 & 21: FC #8 in  Planica
 Men's winners:  Markus Schiffner (#1) /  Dominik Mayländer (#2)
 February 10 & 11: FC #9 in  Breitenberg/Rastbüchl
 Men's winners:  Tomasz Pilch (2 times)
 Women's winners:  Agnes Reisch (2 times)

Snowboarding
2018 Winter Olympics and Paralympics (SB)
 February 10 – 24: Snowboarding at the 2018 Winter Olympics
 Men's Parallel Giant Slalom winners:   Nevin Galmarini;   Lee Sang-ho;   Žan Košir
 Women's Parallel Giant Slalom winners:   Ester Ledecká;   Selina Jörg;   Ramona Theresia Hofmeister
 Men's Halfpipe winners:   Shaun White;   Ayumu Hirano;   Scott James
 Women's Halfpipe winners:   Chloe Kim;   Liu Jiayu;   Arielle Gold
 Men's Big Air winners:   Sébastien Toutant;   Kyle Mack;   Billy Morgan
 Women's Big Air winners:   Anna Gasser;   Jamie Anderson;   Zoi Sadowski-Synnott
 Men's Slopestyle winners:   Redmond Gerard;   Maxence Parrot;   Mark McMorris
 Women's Slopestyle winners:   Jamie Anderson;   Laurie Blouin;   Enni Rukajärvi
 Men's Snowboard Cross winners:   Pierre Vaultier;   Jarryd Hughes;   Regino Hernández
 Women's Snowboard Cross winners:   Michela Moioli;   Julia Pereira de Sousa Mabileau;   Eva Samková
 March 12 & 16: Snowboarding at the 2018 Winter Paralympics
 Men's Banked Slalom winners: SB-UL:   Mike Minor;   Patrick Mayrhofer;   Simon Patmore
 SB-LL1:   Noah Elliott;   Mike Schultz;   Bruno Bošnjak
 SB-LL2:   Gurimu Narita;   Evan Strong;   Matti Suur-Hamari
 Men's Snowboard Cross winners: SB-UL:   Simon Patmore;   Manuel Pozzerle;   Mike Minor
 SB-LL1:   Mike Schultz;   Chris Vos;   Noah Elliott
 SB-LL2:   Matti Suur-Hamari;   Keith Gabel;   Gurimu Narita
 Women's Banked Slalom winners: SB-LL1:   Brenna Huckaby;   Cécile Hernandez;   Amy Purdy
 SB-LL2:   Bibian Mentel;   Brittani Coury;   Lisa Bunschoten
 Women's Snowboard Cross winners:'''
 SB-LL1:   Brenna Huckaby;   Amy Purdy;   Cécile Hernandez
 SB-LL2:   Bibian Mentel;   Lisa Bunschoten;   Astrid Fina

International events
 March 2: Asian Cup (Snowboard) in  Pyeongchang
 Halfpipe winners:  Lee Kwang-ki (m) /  Sunoo Kwon (f)

Alpine snowboarding
 December 14, 2017: ASWC #1 in  Carezza
 Parallel Giant Slalom winners:  Andrey Sobolev (m) /  Ester Ledecká (f)
 December 15 & 16, 2017: ASWC #2 in  Cortina d'Ampezzo
 Parallel Giant Slalom winners:  Alexander Payer (m) /  Ester Ledecká (f)
 Parallel Slalom winners:  Roland Fischnaller (m) /  Sabine Schöffmann (f)
 January 5: ASWC #3 in  Lackenhof
 Parallel Giant Slalom winners:  Nevin Galmarini (m) /  Ester Ledecká (f)
 January 12: ASWC #4 in  Bad Gastein
 Parallel Slalom winners:  Dmitry Loginov (m) /  Ramona Theresia Hofmeister (f)
 January 20 & 21: ASWC #5 in  Rogla Ski Resort
 Men's Parallel Giant Slalom winners:  Andreas Prommegger (#1) /  Benjamin Karl (#2)
 Women's Parallel Giant Slalom winners:  Ester Ledecká (#1) /  Ramona Theresia Hofmeister (#2)
 January 26 & 28: ASWC #6 in  Bansko
 Men's Parallel Giant Slalom winners:  Jasey-Jay Anderson (#1) /  Nevin Galmarini (#2)
 Women's Parallel Giant Slalom winners:  Ester Ledecká (#1) /  Julia Dujmovits (#2)
 March 3: ASWC #7 in  Kayseri
 Parallel Giant Slalom winners:  Stefan Baumeister (m) /  Milena Bykova (f)
 March 10: ASWC #8 in  Scuol
 Parallel Giant Slalom winners:  Tim Mastnak (m) /  Ester Ledecká (f)
 March 17: ASWC #9 (final) in  Winterberg
 Parallel Slalom winners:  Roland Fischnaller (m) /  Selina Jörg (f)

Snowboard cross
 September 8 – 10, 2017: SBXWC #1 in  Cerro Catedral
 Men's Snowboard cross winner:  Alex Pullin (2 times)
 Women's Snowboard cross winners:  Chloé Trespeuch (#1) /  Lindsey Jacobellis (#2)
 December 12 & 13, 2017: SBXWC #2 in  Val Thorens
 Snowboard cross winners:  Paul Berg (m) /  Lindsey Jacobellis (f)
 December 15 – 17, 2017: SBXWC #3 in  Montafon
 Men's Snowboard cross winner:  Jarryd Hughes
 Women's Snowboard cross winner:  Michela Moioli
 Team winners:  (Regino Hernández & Lucas Eguibar) (m) /  (Chloé Trespeuch & Nelly Moenne Loccoz) (f)
 December 21 & 22, 2017: SBXWC #4 in  Breuil-Cervinia
 Snowboard cross winners:  Omar Visintin (m) /  Michela Moioli (f)
 January 20 & 21: SBXWC #5 in  Erzurum
 Snowboard cross winners:  Omar Visintin (m) /  Eva Samková (f)
 Team winners:  (Emanuel Perathoner & Omar Visintin) (m) /  (Nelly Moenne Loccoz & Chloé Trespeuch) (f)
 January 27: SBXWC #6 in  Bansko
 Snowboard cross winners:  Pierre Vaultier (m) /  Charlotte Bankes (f)
 February 2 – 4: SBXWC #7 in  Feldberg
 Men's Snowboard cross winners:  Julian Lueftner (#1) /  Pierre Vaultier (#2)
 Women's Snowboard cross winner:  Michela Moioli (2 times)
 March 2 & 3: SBXWC #8 in  La Molina
 Snowboard Cross winners:  Alessandro Hämmerle (m) /  Eva Samková (f)
 March 10 & 11: SBXWC #9 in  Moscow
 Snowboard Cross winners:  Alessandro Hämmerle (m) /  Eva Samková (f)
 Team winners:  (Emanuel Perathoner & Omar Visintin) (m) /  (Nelly Moenne Loccoz & Chloé Trespeuch) (f)
 March 16 – 18: SBXWC #10 (final) in  Veysonnaz
 Snowboard Cross winners:  Nate Holland (m) /  Michela Moioli (f)
 Team winners:  (Paul Berg & Konstantin Schad) (m) /  (Nelly Moenne Loccoz & Chloé Trespeuch) (f)

Freestyle snowboarding
 September 3 – 9, 2017: FSWC #1 in  Cardrona Alpine Resort
 Slopestyle winners:  Marcus Kleveland (m) /  Jamie Anderson (f)
 Half-pipe winners:  Yuto Totsuka (m) /  Chloe Kim (f)
 November 4, 2017: FSWC #2 in  Copenhagen
 Event cancelled. November 11, 2017: FSWC #3 in  Milan
 Big Air winners:  Chris Corning (m) /  Anna Gasser (f)
 November 24 & 25, 2017: FSWC #4 in  Beijing
 Big Air winners:  Mark McMorris (m) /  Anna Gasser (f)
 December 2, 2017: FSWC #5 in  Mönchengladbach
 Big Air winners:  Marcus Kleveland (m) /  Carla Somaini (f)
 December 7 – 10, 2017: FSWC #6 in  Copper Mountain
 Big Air winners:  Mons Røisland (m) /  Reira Iwabuchi (f)
 Half-pipe winners:  Ayumu Hirano (m) /  Chloe Kim (f)
 December 19 & 21, 2017: FSWC #7 in  Genting Resort Secret Garden
 Half-pipe winners:  Ayumu Hirano (m) /  Liu Jiayu (f)
 January 10 – 13: FSWC #8 in  Snowmass
 Slopestyle winners:  Redmond Gerard (m) /  Christy Prior (f)
 Half-pipe winners:  Shaun White (m) /  Queralt Castellet (f)
 January 17 – 20: FSWC #9 in  Laax
 Note: The slopestyle events here were cancelled. Half-pipe winners:  Iouri Podladtchikov (m) /  Liu Jiayu (f)
 March 15 – 17: FSWC #10 in  Seiser Alm
 Slopestyle winners:  Chris Corning (m) /  Sofya Fyodorova (f)
 March 23 & 24: FSWC #11 (final) in  Stoneham Mountain Resort
 Big Air winners:  Maxence Parrot (m) /  Julia Marino (f)

 2017–18 European Cup (SB)
 November 22 – 23, 2017: SBEC #1 in  Landgraaf
 Men's Slopestyle winners:  Erik Bastiaansen (two times)
 Women's Slopestyle winners:  Evy Poppe (#1) /  Annika Morgan (#2)
 November 25 & 26, 2017: SBEC #2 in  Kaunertal
 Event cancelled. November 29 & 30, 2017: SBEC #3 in  Sankt Leonhard im Pitztal
 Men's Snowboard Cross winners:  Julian Lüftner (#1) /  Nick Baumgartner (#2)
 Women's Snowboard Cross winners:  Rosina Mancari (#1) /  Faye Gulini (#2)
 December 9 & 10, 2017: SBEC #4 in  Hochfügen
 Men's Parallel Giant Slalom winners:  Patrick Bussler (#1) /  Michał Nowaczyk (#2)
 Women's Parallel Giant Slalom winners:  Selina Jörg (#1) /  Sabine Schöffmann (#2)
 January 13 & 14: SBEC #5 in  Jasna
 Men's Slopestyle winners:  Gian Andrea Sutter (#1) /  Noah Vicktor (#2)
 Women's Slopestyle winners:  Annika Morgan (2 times)
 January 13 & 14: SBEC #6 in  Isola 2000
 Men's Snowboard Cross winners:  Ken Vuagnoux (#1) /  Jakob Dusek (#2)
 Women's Snowboard Cross winners:  Holly Roberts (#1) /  Muriel Jost (#2)
 January 19 & 21: SBEC #7 in  Font Romeu
 Big Air winners:  Leon Vockensperger (m) /  Lea Jugovac (f)
 Slopestyle winners:  Leon Vockensperger (m) /  Lea Jugovac (f)
 January 20 & 21: SBEC #8 in  Lachtal
 Men's Parallel Giant Slalom winners:  Daniele Bagozza (2 times)
 Women's Parallel Giant Slalom winners:  Jemima Juritz (#1) /  Alexandra Vlasenko (#2)
 January 23 & 24: SBEC #9 in  Vars
 Slopestyle winners:  Gian Andrea Sutter (m) /  Ariane Burri (f)
 Big Air winners:  Leon Vockensperger (m) /  Katarzyna Rusin (f)
 January 27 & 28: SBEC #10 in  Crans-Montana
 Halfpipe winners:  Elias Allenspach (m) /  Kaja Verdnik (f)
 Big Air winners:  Enzo Valax (m) /  Lia-Mara Bösch (f)
 January 27 & 28: SBEC #11 in  Grasgehren
 Men's Snowboard Cross winners:  Florian Gregor (#1) /  Jakob Dusek (#2)
 Women's Snowboard Cross winners:  Alexia Queyrel (#1) /  Sofia Belingheri (#2)
 January 3 & 4: SBEC #12 in  Puy-Saint-Vincent
 Men's Snowboard Cross winners:  Jakob Dusek (#1) /  Luca Hämmerle (#2)
 Women's Snowboard Cross winners:  Muriel Jost (2 times)
 February 10 & 11: SBEC #13 in  Pamporovo
 This event was cancelled. February 10 & 11: SBEC #14 in  Lenzerheide
 Men's Parallel Slalom winners:  Maurizio Bormolini (#1) /  Daniele Bagozza (#2)
 Women's Parallel Slalom winners:  Larissa Gasser (#1) /  Jemima Juritz (#2)
 February 18: SBEC #15 in  Sarajevo
 Big Air winners:  Enzo Valax (m) /  Thalie Larochaix (f)
 February 23 & 24: SBEC #16 in  Davos
 Halfpipe winners:  Viktor Ivanov (m) /  Verena Rohrer (f)
 February 25 & 26: SBEC #17 in  Kopaonik
 Men's Big Air winners:  Enzo Valax (#1) 
 Women's Big Air winners:  Lea Jugovac (#1) 
 Note: Second events of Big Air here is cancelled.
 March 1 – 3: SBEC #18 in  Götschen
 Big Air winners:  Leon Vockensperger (m) /  Loranne Smans (f)
 March 10: SBEC #19 in  Pec pod Sněžkou
 Slopestyle winners:  Nicola Liviero (m) /  Katarzyna Rusin (f)
 March 9 – 11: SBEC #20 in  Lenk
 Men's Snowboard Cross winners:  Matthew Thomas (2 times)
 Women's Snowboard Cross winners:  Hanna Ihedioha (#1) /  Alexia Queyrel (#2)
 March 10 & 11: SBEC #21 in  Tauplitz
 Men's Parallel Slalom winners:  Johann Stefaner (2 times)
 Women's Parallel Slalom winners:  Maria Valova (#1) /  Jemima Juritz (#2)

 2017–18 North American Cup (SB) 
 December 9 & 10, 2017: NAC #1 in  Steamboat Ski Resort
 Parallel Giant Slalom winners:  Steven MacCutcheon (m) /  Millie Bongiorno
 Parallel Slalom winners:  Christian De Oliveira (m) /  Jennifer Hawkrigg (f)
 December 11 – 16, 2017:: NAC #2 in  Copper Mountain
 Men's Halfpipe winners:  Raibu Katayama (#1) /  Yūto Totsuka (#2)
 Women's Halfpipe winners:  Torah Bright (#1) /  Kurumi Imai (#2)
 December 15 – 17, 2017:: NAC #3 in  Buck Hill
 Men's Parallel Slalom winners:  William Taylor (#1) /  Richard-Riley Kilmer-Choi (#2) /  Dylan Udolf (#3)
 Women's Parallel Slalom winners:  Jennifer Hawkrigg (2 times) /  Karina Bladon (#3)
 January 3 – 5: NAC #4 in  Le Relais
 Men's Parallel Giant Slalom winners:  Michael Nazwaski (#1) /  Arnaud Gaudet (#2)
 Women's Parallel Giant Slalom winners:  Millie Bongiorno (#1) /  Jennifer Hawkrigg (#2)
 January 23 & 24: NAC #5 in  Sun Peaks Resort
 Men's Slopestyle winners:  Liam Gill (#1) /  Liam Brearley (#2)
 Women's Slopestyle winners:  Jasmine Baird (#1) /  Sommer Gendron (#2)
 January 26 – 28: NAC #6 in  Big White Ski Resort
 Men's Snowboard Cross winners:  Danny Bourgeois (2 times)
 Women's Snowboard Cross winners:  Emilie-Kate Robinson-Leith (2 times)
 January 31 – February 2: NAC #7 in  Holiday Valley
 Men's Parallel Giant Slalom winners:  Arnaud Gaudet (#1) /  Jules Lefebvre (#2)
 Women's Parallel Giant Slalom winners:  Megan Farrell (2 times)
 February 4 – 9: NAC #8 in  Blue Mountain Resort
 Parallel Giant Slalom winners:  Darren Gardner (m) /  Megan Farrell (f)
 Parallel Slalom winners:  Sebastien Beaulieu (m) /  Megan Farrell (f)
 February 7 – 9: NAC #9 in  Craigleith
 Men's Snowboard Cross winners:  Senna Leith (2 times)
 Women's Snowboard Cross winners:  Elise Turner (#1) /  Stacy Gaskill (#2)
 February 8 – 10: NAC #10 in  Mount St-Louis Moonstone	
 Slopestyle winners:  Nicolas Laframboise (m) /  Jasmine Baird (f)
 Halfpipe winners:  Jack Collins (m) /  Taylor Obregon (f)
 February 12 – 15: NAC #11 in  Sunday River
 Men's Snowboard Cross winners:  Danny Bourgeois (2 times)
 Women's Snowboard Cross winners:  Emily Boyce (#1) /  Anna Miller (#2)
 February 20 – 22: NAC #12 in  Toronto
 Men's Parallel Slalom winners:  Robert Burns (2 times)
 Women's Parallel Slalom winners:  Megan Farrell (2 times)
 February 21 – 23: NAC #13 in  Mont Orignal
 Men's Snowboard Cross winners:  Liam Moffatt (#1) /  Danny Bourgeois (#2)
 Women's Snowboard Cross winners:  Danielle Steinhoff (#1) /  Emily Boyce (#2)
 February 27 & 28: NAC #14 in  Park City
 Halfpipe winners:  Chase Blackwell (m) /  Anna Valentine (f)
 Slopestyle winners:  Lyon Farrell (m) /  Courtney Rummel (f)
 March 5 – 8: NAC #15 in  Sugarloaf
 Men's Snowboard Cross winners:  Henry Collins (#1) /  Danny Bourgeois (#2)
 Women's Snowboard Cross winners:  Stacy Gaskill (#1) /  Anna Miller (#2)
 March 5 – 11: NAC #16 in  Canada Olympic Park, AB
 Halfpipe winners:  Shawn Fair (m) /  Calynn Irwin (f)
 Slopestyle winners:  William Buffey (m) /  Jasmine Baird (f)

 2017 South American Cup (SB)
 August 11 & 12: SAC #1 in  La Parva #1
 Slopestyle #1 winners:  Federico Chiaradio (m) /  Antonia Yáñez (f)
 Slopestyle #2 winners:  Matias Schmitt (m) /  Antonia Yáñez (f)
 August 25 & 26: SAC #2 in  La Parva #2
 Snowboardcross #1 winners:  Kevin Hill (m) /  Meryeta Odine (f)
 Snowboardcross #2 here is cancelled
 September 4 & 5: SAC #3 in  Corralco (part of XXIII Brazilian Snowboard Championships)
 Snowboardcross #1 winners:  Markus Schairer (m) /  Isabel Clark Ribeiro (f)
 Snowboardcross #2 here is cancelled
 September 12 & 13: SAC #4 in  Cerro Catedral
 Snowboardcross #1 winners:  Danny Bourgeois (m) /  Simona Meiler (f)
 Snowboardcross #2 winners:  Danny Bourgeois (m) /  Anna Miller (f)
 September 17 & 18: SAC #5 in  Cerro Catedral
 Big Air #1 winners:  Martín Jaureguialzo (m) /  Macarena Valle (f)
 Big Air #2 winners:  Martín Jaureguialzo (m) /  Sandra Isabel Hillen Rodriguez (f)

 2017 Australia & New Zealand Cup (SB)
 July 26 – 28: SBANC #1 in  Mount Hotham #1
 Snowboardcross #1 winners:  Cameron Bolton (m) /  Georgia Baff (f)
 Snowboardcross #2 winners:  Alex Pullin (m) /  Georgia Baff (f)
 August 15 – 17: SBANC #2 in  Cardrona (part of FIS Continental Cup)
 Halfpipe winners:  Naito Ando (m) /  Emily Arthur (f)
 Slopestyle winners:  Matthew Cox (m) /  Reira Iwabuchi (f)
 August 24 – 27: SBANC #3 in  Mount Hotham #2
 Snowboardcross #1 winners:  Alex Pullin (m) /  Emily Boyce (f)
 Snowboardcross #2 winners:  Alex Pullin (m) /  Emily Boyce  (f)

Telemark skiing
FIS Telemark Junior World Ski Championships
 March 19 – 25: 2018 FIS Junior World Ski Championships (TS) in  Mürren-Schilthorn
 Sprint winners:  Romain Beney (m) /  Kaja Bjoernstad Konow (f)
 Classic winners:  Noe Claye (m) /  Chloe Blyth (f)
 Parallel Sprint winners:  Louis Uber (m) /  Goril Strom Eriksen (f)
 Mixed Team Parallel Sprint winners: 

2017–18 FIS Telemark World Cup
 December 1 – 3, 2017: TSWC #1 in  Hintertux
 Men's Sprint winners:  Bastien Dayer (#1) /  Nicolas Michel (#2)
 Women's Sprint winners:  Beatrice Zimmermann (#1) /  Johanna Holzmann (#2)
 Parallel Sprint winners:  Bastien Dayer (m) /  Johanna Holzmann (f)
 January 12 & 13: TSWC #2 in  Pralognan-la-Vanoise
 Sprint winners:  Nicolas Michel (m) /  Johanna Holzmann (f)
 Classic winners:  Stefan Matter (m) /  Argeline Tan Bouquet (f)
 January 20 – 22: TSWC #3 in  Suicide Six
 Men's Sprint winners:  Jure Ales (#1) /  Nicolas Michel (#2)
 Women's Sprint winners:  Jasmin Taylor (#1) /  Simone Oehrli (#2)
 Parallel Sprint winners:  Nicolas Michel (m) /  Johanna Holzmann (f)
 January 24 – 26: TSWC #4 in  Sugarbush Resort
 Classic #1 winners:  Jure Ales (m) /  Jasmin Taylor (f)
 Classic #2 winners:  Philippe Lau (m) /  Argeline Tan Bouquet (f)
 Sprint winners:  Philippe Lau (m) /  Argeline Tan Bouquet (f)
 February 3 & 4: TSWC #5 in  Bad Hindelang-Oberjoch
 Sprint winners:  Philippe Lau (m) /  Beatrice Zimmermann (f)
 Parallel Sprint winners:  Nicolas Michel (m) /  Johanna Holzmann (f)
 February 7 & 8: TSWC #6 in  Krvavec Ski Resort
 Note: The sprint events here were cancelled.''
 Parallel Sprint winners:  Stefan Matter (m) /  Jasmin Taylor (f)
 March 14 – 17: TSWC #7 in  Rjukan
 Sprint #1 winners:  Trym Nygaard Loeken (m) /  Martina Wyss (f)
 Sprint #2 winners:  Philippe Lau (m) /  Argeline Tan Bouquet (f)
 Men's Parallel Sprint winners:  Trym Nygaard Loeken (#1) /  Jure Ales (#2)
 Women's Parallel Sprint winner:  Johanna Holzmann (2 times)
 March 19 – 25: TSWC #8 (final) in  Mürren-Schilthorn (part of FIS Telemark Junior World Championships)
 Sprint winners:  Trym Nygaard Loeken (m) /  Johanna Holzmann (f)
 Classic winners:  Trym Nygaard Loeken (m) /  Beatrice Zimmermann (f)
 Parallel Sprint winners:  Philippe Lau (m) /  Jasmin Taylor (f)
 Mixed Team Parallel Sprint winners:

References

External links
 International Ski Federation official website
 IPC Alpine Skiing official website
 International Biathlon Union official website
 IPC Biathlon and Cross Country Skiing official website
 IPC Snowboard official website

Skiing by year
Skiing
Skiing